= List of flautists =

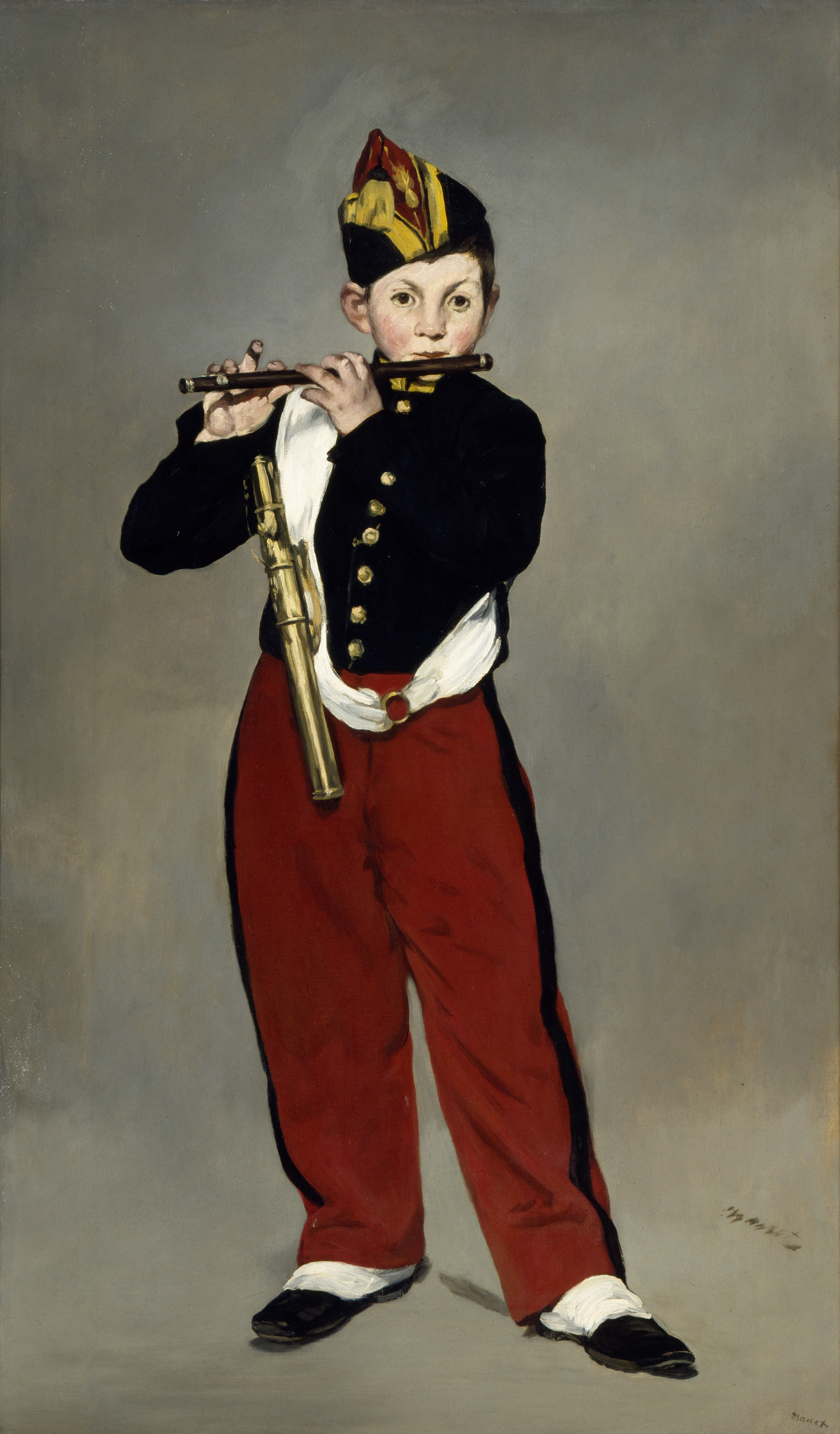
Young Flutist, or The Fifer by Édouard Manet (1866)

This is a list of notable flute players, also called flautists or flutists, organized alphabetically by the type of flute and musical genre in which they are best known.

== Western Classical ==
Flutists who play the western concert flute, especially in classical music:

- Richard Adeney
- Egidius Aerts
- Robert Aitken
- Wellington E. Alves
- William Alwyn
- John Amadio
- Neville Amadio
- Joachim Andersen
- Claudi Arimany
- Andrew Ashe
- Nina Assimakopoulos
- Johann Jacob Bach
- Julius Baker
- John Barcellona
- Samuel Baron
- Huáscar Barradas
- Georges Barrère
- Francesco Barsanti
- Jeanne Baxtresser
- Larry Beauregard
- Michel Bellavance
- William Bennett
- Atarah Ben-Tovim
- Henri Besozzi
- Sharon Bezaly
- Lisa Beznosiuk
- Boris Bizjak
- Frances Blaisdell
- Andreas Blau
- Michel Blavet
- Vilém Blodek
- Theobald Boehm – also inventor of predecessor of modern flute
- François Borne
- Denis Bouriakov
- Jane M. Bowers
- Adrian Brett
- Giulio Briccialdi
- Carlos Bruneel
- Katherine Bryan
- Ferdinand Büchner
- Pierre-Gabriel Buffardin
- Marisa Canales
- Roland Cardon – alias Guy Rodenhof
- Robert Cavally
- Frédéric Chalon
- Claire Chase
- Laura Chislett
- Jasmine Choi
- Cesare Ciardi
- Ian Clarke
- Valerie Coleman
- Albert Cooper – also flute maker and inventor of Cooper scale
- Gaston Crunelle
- David Davies
- Michel Debost
- Leonardo De Lorenzo
- Jules Demersseman
- Abbie de Quant
- François Devienne
- Franz Doppler
- Karl Doppler
- Béla Drahos
- Louis Drouet
- Mathieu Dufour
- Friedrich Dülon
- Paul Lustig Dunkel
- Hilary du Pré
- Elena Duran
- Mario Duschenes
- Doriot Anthony Dwyer
- Alfred John Ellory
- Timothy Essex
- Pedro Eustache
- Bülent Evcil
- Andrew Findon
- Thierry Fischer
- Louis Fleury
- Dieter Flury
- John Fonville
- Frederick the Great – Prussian king and avid amateur
- John Frohling
- Anton Bernhard Fürstenau
- Kaspar Fürstenau
- Moritz Fürstenau
- Patrick Gallois
- James Galway
- Bianca Garcia
- Giuseppe Gariboldi
- Anna Garzuly
- Philippe Gaubert
- Severino Gazzelloni
- Paul Génin
- Jean-Claude Gérard
- Tula Giannini
- Richard Giese
- Geoffrey Gilbert
- Friedrich Hartmann Graf
- Peter-Lukas Graf
- Irena Grafenauer
- Uwe Grodd
- Ørnulf Gulbransen
- Nicholas Gunn
- Ute Günther
- Viviana Guzmán
- Michael Hasel
- Rházes Hernández-López
- Gudrun Hinze
- Katherine Hoover
- Stefán Ragnar Höskuldsson
- Jacques-Martin Hotteterre
- Luigi Hugues
- Timothy Hutchins
- Christopher Hyde-Smith
- Gerald Jackson
- Sébastian Jacot
- André Jaunet
- Jens Josef
- Catherine Ransom Karoly
- Dirk Keetbaas
- Bettine Keyßer
- Jeffrey Khaner
- William Kincaid
- Kristiyan Koev
- Ernesto Köhler
- Jadwiga Kotnowska
- John C. Krell
- Frederich Kuhlau
- Barthold Kuijken
- Kaspar Kummer
- Michel de la Barre
- Eric Lamb
- Robert Langevin
- Sidney Lanier
- Maxence Larrieu
- Nicholas Laucella
- John Lemmone
- Hans-Martin Linde
- Nicola Lindsay
- Diana López Moyal
- Donato Lovreglio
- Kathryn Lukas
- Antoine Mahaut
- Alain Marion
- Jaime Martín
- Marya Martin
- Nicholas McGegan
- Lorna McGhee
- Demarre McGill
- Gareth McLearnon
- Victor McMahon
- Susan Milan
- Ulla Miilmann
- Claude Monteux
- Barbara Morgan – educator and former astronaut
- Tadashi Mori
- Gareth Morris
- Louis Moyse
- Marcel Moyse
- Ulrich Müller-Doppler
- Milan Munclinger
- Reza Najfar
- Ingrid Søfteland Neset
- Charles Nicholson
- Aurèle Nicolet
- Thomas Nyfenger
- Emmanuel Pahud
- Eleonore Pameijer
- Kathinka Pasveer
- Maggi Payne
- Philippe Rebille Philbert
- Marina Piccinini
- James Poke
- Claire Polin
- Ardal Powell
- Stephen Preston
- Johann Joachim Quantz – instructor of Frederick the Great, and author of important treatise
- Jean-Pierre Rampal
- Joseph Rampal
- Kurt Redel
- Jean Rémusat
- José María del Carmen Ribas
- Gwyn Roberts
- Paula Robison
- Mindy Rosenfeld
- Elizabeth Rowe
- Jane Rutter
- Gro Sandvik
- Federico Maria Sardelli
- Adolf Scherbaum
- Gary Schocker
- Karl-Heinz Schütz
- John Scott
- Johann Sedlatzek
- Elaine Shaffer
- Felix Skowronek
- Fenwick Smith
- Harvey Sollberger
- Ashley Solomon
- John Solum
- Mark Sparks
- Fritz Spiegl
- Christian Sprenger
- Simion Stanciu
- Sanja Stijačić
- Alexa Still
- Mimi Stillman
- Jiří Stivín
- James Strauss
- Lamar Stringfield
- Leoš Svárovský
- Paolo Taballione
- Paul Taffanel
- Paul Taub
- Adolf Terschak
- Mark Thomas
- Rudolf Tillmetz
- Albert Tipton
- Manfred Trojahn
- Johann George Tromlitz
- Vladimir Tsybin
- Jean-Louis Tulou
- Owen Underhill
- Pierre-André Valade
- Joaquín Valverde Durán
- Henk van der Vliet
- David Van Vactor
- Peter Verhoyen
- Linda Vogt
- Adam Walker
- Jim Walker
- Robert Hugh Willoughby
- Meredith Willson
- Ransom Wilson
- Carol Wincenc
- Johann Georg Wunderlich
- Charles Wyatt
- Trevor Wye
- Robert Wykes
- Carl Zerrahn
- Matthias Ziegler
- Karlheinz Zöller
- Jacques Zoon
- Eugenia Zukerman
- Ariel Zuckermann

== Indian ==
Flutists who play the Bansuri:

- Devendra Murdeshwar
- Mayavaram Saraswathi Ammal
- K. Bhaskaran
- Sikkil Mala Chandrasekar
- Debopriya Chatterjee
- Hariprasad Chaurasia
- Rakesh Chaurasia
- Milind Date
- Pannalal Ghosh
- Keshav Ginde
- Pravin Godkhindi
- Steve Gorn
- Nityanand Haldipur
- Kudamaloor Janardanan
- Chetan Joshi
- Naveen Kumar
- T. R. "Mali" Mahalingam
- Ronu Majumdar
- Pandit Niranjan Prasad
- Raghunath Prasanna
- Rajendra Prasanna
- Rishab Prasanna
- Raghavendran Rajasekaran
- H. Ramachandra Shastry
- Natesan Ramani
- Thiagarajan Ramani
- Vijay Raghav Rao
- G. S. Sachdev
- Palladam Sanjiva Rao
- T. S. Sankaran
- Tiruchy L. Saravanan
- Dipak Sarma
- Sarabha Sastri
- Raghunath Seth
- B. Shankar Rao
- Sikkil Sisters – Kunjumani & Neela
- Prapancham Sitaram
- T. N. Sivakumar
- Shashank Subramanyam
- Tanjore Viswanathan
- Ma Anand Yashu
- Bapu Padmanabha

== Irish ==
Flutists who play the Irish flute:

- Harry Bradley
- Vincent Broderick
- Paddy Carty
- Catherine Coleman – astronaut
- Kevin Crawford
- Eddie Duffy
- Packie Duignan
- Brian Dunning
- Séamus Egan
- Brian Finnegan
- Michael Flatley
- Steph Geremia
- Carmel Gunning
- Peter Horan
- Frankie Kennedy
- Joanie Madden
- Josie McDermott
- Michael McGoldrick
- John McKenna
- Matt Molloy
- Conal Ó Gráda
- Peadar O'Loughlin
- Marcas Ó Murchú
- Francis O'Neill
- Mike Rafferty
- Micho Russell
- Seamus Tansey
- Michael Tubridy

== Japanese ==
Flutists who play Japanese flutes including the Shakuhachi:

- Christopher Yohmei Blasdel
- Watazumi Doso
- Robin Hartshorne
- Yoshikazu Iwamoto
- Phil Nyokai James
- Kaoru Kakizakai
- Masayuki Koga
- Ron Korb – also other world flutes
- Kinko Kurosawa
- Ken LaCosse
- Riley Lee
- Kōhachiro Miyata
- John Kaizan Neptune
- Kokū Nishimura
- Atsuya Okuda
- Alcvin Ramos
- Rodrigo Rodriguez
- James Nyoraku Schlefer
- Ronnie Nyogetsu Reishin Seldin
- Gorō Yamaguchi
- Hōzan Yamamoto
- Katsuya Yokoyama
- Masakazu Yoshizawa

== Native American ==
Flutists who play Native American flutes:

- Bryan Akipa
- Michael Graham Allen
- Timothy Archambault
- Jeff Ball
- Odell Borg
- Robert Tree Cody
- Brent Michael Davids
- Joseph Fire Crow
- Mark Holland
- Al Jewer
- Nicole LaRoche
- Hawk Littlejohn
- Charles Littleleaf
- Kevin Locke
- Tom Mauchahty-Ware
- Bill Miller
- Robert Mirabal
- Michael Murphy
- R. Carlos Nakai
- Sonny Nevaquaya
- Jay Red Eagle
- Douglas Spotted Eagle
- Barry Stramp
- Gentle Thunder
- Andrew Vasquez
- Tommy Wildcat
- Mary Youngblood

== Other traditional / Folk ==
Flutists who play other types of flute:

- Altamiro Carrilho – Brazilian
- Joaquim da Silva – Brazilian
- Bora Dugić – Serbian
- Avraham Eilam-Amzallag – Israeli
- Gilbert Favre – Bolivian
- Julie Fowlis – Scottish
- Hassan Kassai – Persian
- Liu Qichao – Chinese
- Efraín Loyola – Cuban
- Fănică Luca – Romanian
- Yacouba Moumouni – Nigerien
- Chris Norman – Scottish
- Hossein Omoumi – Persian
- Hemapala Perera – Sri Lankan
- Lou Pérez – Cuban
- Pixinguinha – Brazilian
- Niyazi Sayın – Turkish
- Omar Faruk Tekbilek – Turkish
- Neyzen Tevfik – Turkish
- Henry Thomas – American
- Otha Turner – American
- Uiliami Leilua Vi – Tongan
- Gheorghe Zamfir – Romanian

== Jazz / New Age ==
Flutists who play flute in jazz or New-age music:

- André 3000
- George Adams
- Marshall Allen
- Curtis Amy
- Ashleigh Ball
- Phillip Bent
- Sean Bergin
- T. K. Blue
- Andrea Brachfeld
- Jane Bunnett
- Don Burrows
- Wayman Carver
- Danilo Caymmi
- Eugenio Colombo
- John Coltrane
- Charles Compo
- Hector Costita
- Charles Davis
- Jean Derome
- Robert Dick
- Eric Dixon
- Fostina Dixon
- Lyn Dobson
- Eric Dolphy
- Bob Downes
- Damian Drăghici
- Matt Eakle
- Marty Ehrlich
- Kat Epple
- Joe Farrell
- Sonny Fortune
- Peter Guidi
- Guttorm Guttormsen
- Vincent Herring
- Paul Horn
- Bobbi Humphrey
- Fred Jackson Jr.
- Bobby Jaspar
- Simon Jensen
- Tom Keenlyside
- Wouter Kellerman
- Rahsaan Roland Kirk
- Moe Koffman
- Joe Kučera
- Brian Landrus
- Prince Lasha
- Yusef Lateef
- Hubert Laws
- Geoff Leigh
- Björn J:son Lindh
- Charles Lloyd
- "Magic" Malik Mezzadri
- Herbie Mann
- Bill McBirnie
- Harold McNair
- Lloyd McNeill
- Chris Michell
- Bobby Militello
- Nicole Mitchell
- James Moody
- Ras Moshe
- Sam Most
- Charlie Munro
- David "Fathead" Newman
- James Newton
- Andy Panayi
- Eddie Parker
- Greg Pattillo – beatboxing while playing the flute
- Finn Peters
- Jaime Prats
- Raja Ram
- Nelson Rangell
- Niki Reiser
- Jerome Richardson
- Sam Rivers
- Ali Ryerson
- Pharoah Sanders
- Clifford Scott
- Bud Shank
- Sahib Shihab
- Ronald Snijders
- Alberto Socarras
- Les Spann
- James Spaulding
- Jeremy Steig
- Nicola Stilo
- John Stubblefield
- Rowland Sutherland
- Lew Tabackin
- Joe Thomas
- Frank Tiberi
- Fred Tompkins
- Néstor Torres
- Theo Travis
- Norris Turney
- Dave Valentin
- Harold Vick
- Miho Wada
- Jim Walker
- Carlos Ward
- Frank Wess
- Steve Wilson
- Leo Wright
- Ma Anand Yashu
- Alexander Zonjic

== Rock / Pop ==
Flutists who play flute in rock or pop music:

- Ian Anderson – Jethro Tull
- India Arie
- Kofi Burbridge – Tedeschi Trucks Band
- Barry Burns – Mogwai
- Mel Collins – King Crimson
- Burton Cummings – The Guess Who
- Charles DeChant – Hall & Oates
- Jerry Eubanks – Marshall Tucker Band
- Peter Gabriel – Genesis
- John Hackett
- Barry Hay – Golden Earring
- Tee Mac Iseli
- David Jackson – Van der Graaf Generator
- Sevan Kirder – Eluveitie
- Terry Kirkman – The Association
- Andrew Latimer – Camel
- Lizzo
- Rozalind MacPhail
- Ian McDonald – King Crimson
- Teddy Osei – Osibisa
- Walter Parazaider – Chicago
- Edwin Rist
- Florian Schneider – Kraftwerk
- Ray Thomas – The Moody Blues
- Thijs van Leer – Focus
- Tim Weisberg – jazz, rock, fusion
- Ann Wilson – Heart
- Chris Wood – Traffic

== See also ==
- List of piccolo players
- List of recorder players
