= Bellavance =

Bellavance is a surname. Notable people with the surname include:

- André Bellavance (born 1964), a Canadian politician
- Louise Bellavance (born 1943), a Canadian social worker
- Michel Bellavance, a Swiss flautist of Canadian origin
- Scott Bellavance (born 1975), a Canadian freestyle skier

The origins of this name can be found on this website: www.gagnier.org

It is descended from a member of the Gagne family, Pierre 1610-1656) who immigrated from France to Ste. Anne de Beaupre Quebec in 1653. The original spelling was Gasnier, later spelled Gagnier, Gagne and many other variations.

Louis, third son of Pierre, obtained a title of Signeur as Lord of the Fresnaye and with it a new name, Bellavance. He chose to give his property at Cap-Saint-Ignace the name La Fresnaye after a manor located near his former village in France. He is the ancestor of the Bellavance line in Quebec.
