= Michael J. Murphy =

Michael J. Murphy may refer to:

- Mike Murphy (Washington politician)
- Michael J. Murphy (builder), builder in Carmel-by-the-Sea, California
- Michael J. Murphy (diplomat), American diplomat
- Michael J. Murphy (police commissioner) (1913–1997), American police commissioner
- Michael John Murphy, American folk musician
- Michael Joseph Murphy (1915–2007), American prelate of the Roman Catholic Church
- Mike Murphy (Michael James Murphy), Irish broadcaster, actor and property developer
- Mike Murphy (ice hockey, born 1950) (Michael John Murphy), Canadian ice hockey player
- Mike Murphy (baseball) (Michael Jerome Murphy), American Major League Baseball catcher
- Michael J. Murphy, British low-budget filmmaker.

== See also ==
- Michael Murphy (disambiguation)
