= Cluj International Music Competition =

Romanian international music competition

Cluj International Music Competition (CIMC) is a biennial event hosted by the Gheorghe Dima Music Academy in Cluj-Napoca, Romania. Organised by Notes & Ties Cultural Association, CIMC has grown into a globally recognised classical music competition.

== History ==
First known as the Gheorghe Dima International Music Competition, the event was started in 1984 by the Gheorghe Dima Music Academy and ran continuously for twelve editions. After a gap of thirteen years, it was revived and between 2011 and 2019 it was dedicated to woodwind instruments. The last five editions, dedicated to pairs of instruments (flute and clarinet in 2011, 2015, 2017 and 2019; oboe and trumpet in 2013) marked a leap forward for the competition's international recognition, with some of the most recognised performers in the world as jury members and a large number of contestants from all over the globe.

== Jury Members ==
The competition has drawn attention for inviting jurors who are themselves young, and for inviting previous winners to be jurors for future competitions.

=== 2021 Hybrid edition ===
President of the juries Răzvan Poptean (Romania)

Flute	Clarinet
Denis Bouriakov (Russia) Silvia Careddu (Italy) Mathilde Calderini (France) Seiya Ueno (Japan) Loïc Scheider (France) Sébastian Jacot (Switzerland) Eduard Belmar (Spain) Matvey Demin (Russia) Yubeen Kim (Korea) Clément Dufour (France) Alberto Acuña Almela (Spain)	Nicolas Baldeyrou (France) Christelle Pochet (Belgium) Shirley Brill (Israel) Giovanni Punzi (Italy) Han Kim (Korea) Carlos Ferreira (Portugal) Spyros Mourikis (Greece) Damien Bachmann (Switzerland) Sergey Eletskiy (Russia) Sérgio Fernandes Pires (Portugal) Joë Christophe (France)
