= Dorian Wind Quintet =

American wind quintet

Dorian Wind Quintet is an American wind quintet. Formed at Tanglewood Music Festival, Tennessee, in 1961, their repertoire includes Baroque pieces to contemporary pieces. They have released recordings on Summit, New World, and CRI Records. Members have included Catherine Ransom Karoly and Jerry Kirkbride.

They have commissioned works by composers including George Perle's Wind Quintet IV, 1986 Pulitzer Prize for Music winner. In 1981 they were the first wind quintet to appear in Carnegie Hall.

The ensemble's members are flutist Anthony Trionfo, oboist Roni Gal-Ed, clarinetist Benjamin Fingland, bassoonist Adrian Morejon and French hornist Karl Kramer-Johansen.

== See also ==
- Dorian mode
