= List of piccolo players =

This is a list of notable piccolo players, organized alphabetically.

- John C. Krell
- Andrew Macleod
- Vladimir Tsybin
- Peter Verhoyen
- Meredith Willson
