= Music of Nebraska =

The Music of Nebraska has included a variety of country, jazz, blues, ragtime, rock, and alternative rock musicians. Though many cities and towns across the state have active musical scenes, artists from Omaha and Lincoln have a particularly important musical legacy.

== Omaha ==
Artists on the label Saddle Creek Records in Omaha, such as Bright Eyes, The Faint, and Cursive, are nationally renowned. The formation of the sound occurred in the mid-1990s with Commander Venus, Frontier Trust, Weak, and Matchbook Shannon, and clubs such as the Cog Factory, and Sokol Music Hall. The 2000s saw a rise in popularity of Saddle Creek Records. The label went on to build a music venue called Slowdown. The Waiting Room also opened in March 2007.

The alternative music scene has produced such popular artists as 311, Beaver & the Hottage Cutch, Betsy Wells and Grasshopper Takeover, and Omaha has been a temporary home base of Midwest bands such as Tilly and the Wall, Rilo Kiley, The Urge, Pomeroy, and Blue October. Tim McMahan's Lazy-i and SLAMOmaha.com are the main media outlets promoting Saddle Creek and other Omaha bands.

In Omaha, a mainstay of the music scene is Nils Anders Erickson. The studio houses modern equipment and has recorded with artists with local connections such as 311, but what makes the studio famous is its collection of vintage equipment. On addition to the studio, Nils heads local jam band Paddy O'Furniture. Other mainstays of the music scene in Omaha include folk artists such as Simon Joyner, Kyle Knapp, and his son, Saddle Creek artist Joe Knapp, Joe Watson, Mike Murphy, Kevin Quinn, and electronic artists Peter None and Chip Davis.

Notable jazz musicians include jazz guitarist Dave Stryker and drummer Victor Lewis.

Omaha also has many heavier rock and metal acts. In the mid to late 1990s the bands Secret Skin, Clever, and Twitch dominated the scene with their highly rhythmic and guitar-driven sound. Since the turn of the millennium, it has been a strong spot for Metalcore bands. A good amount have gone on to be National acts, such as Analog, Paria, System Failure, and I Am Legend. Also, the Power Metal band Cellador hails from Omaha. It also draws many other heavy musical acts, including many Screamo artists, including Eyes of Verotika, Caught in the Fall, and Robots Don't Cry. Other notable groups include Noah's Ark was a Spaceship, Back When, and Father.

Blues advocates including Terry O'Halloran and the Omaha Blues Society have brought world class blues to Omaha. Local artists like Satchel Grande, Kris Lager Band, and Funk Trek are examples of popular local blues artists. Their predecessors Electric Soul Method and Polydypsia helped set the stage for this music to grow in Omaha.

=== North Omaha ===
From the 1920s through the early 1960s North Omaha boasted a vibrant entertainment district featuring African American music. The main artery of North 24th Street was the heart of the city's African-American cultural and business community with a thriving jazz and rhythm and blues scene that attracted top-flight swing, blues and jazz bands from across the country.

An important venue was the storied Dreamland Ballroom, which was opened in the Jewell Building in 1923 at 24th and Grant Streets in the Near North Side neighborhood. Dreamland hosted some of the greatest jazz, blues, and swing performers, including Duke Ellington, Count Basie, Louis Armstrong, Lionel Hampton, and the original Nat King Cole Trio. Whitney Young spoke there as well. Other venues included Jim Bell's Harlem, opened in 1935 on Lake Street, west of 24th; McGill's Blue Room, located at 24th and Lake, and Allen's Showcase Lounge, which was located at 24th and Lake. Due to racial segregation, musicians such as Cab Calloway stayed at Myrtle Washington's at 22nd and Willis while others stayed at Charlie Trimble's at 22nd and Seward. The intersection of 24th and Lake was the setting of the Big Joe Williams song "Omaha Blues".

=== Notable North Omaha musicians ===
North Omaha used to be a hub for black jazz musicians, 'the triple-A league' where national bands would go to find a player to fill out their ensemble. - Preston Love

Blues singer Wynonie Harris was born and raised in Omaha. Early North Omaha bands included Lewis' Excelsior Brass Band, Dan Desdunes Band, Simon Harrold's Melody Boys, the Sam Turner Orchestra, the Ted Adams Orchestra, the Omaha Night Owls, Red Perkins and His Original Dixie Ramblers, and the Lloyd Hunter Band who became the first Omaha band to record in 1931. A Lloyd Hunter concert poster can be seen on display at the Community Center in nearby Mineola, Iowa.

North Omaha's musical culture also produced several nationally and internationally known African American musicians. Preston Love and drummer Buddy Miles were friends while growing up and they collaborated throughout their lives. Big Joe Williams and funk band leader Lester Abrams are also from North Omaha. Omaha-born Wynonie Harris, one of the founders of rock and roll, got his start at the North Omaha clubs and for a time lived in the now-demolished Logan Fontennelle projects at 2213 Charles Street.

=== Surf ===
One of Omaha's most famous exports is the influential surf band The Chevrons, who were voted Omaha's most popular band in 1966. Other 1960s bands include The Echos, 7 Legends, Velvet Haze, Little Denny Wonder, Freedom Road and The Beautiful People.

== Other places ==
=== Fremont ===
The earliest rock and roll band from Fremont, Nebraska was The Nomads, followed by The Sneakers, The Fugitives, The Invaders, The Brakmen and The Coachmen. The long-running popular Haywood-Wakefield Band is maybe the region's most influential band. Doug Campbell from Lincoln, Little Joe & the Ramrods, The Smoke Ring, Don Sohl & the Roadrunners and Ron Thompson & the Broughams were also influential.

=== Lincoln ===
Lincoln has had a thriving music scene since the 1950s. Lincoln's Zager and Evans hit #1 on the Billboard Hot 100 chart for six weeks with their song In the Year 2525 from 1969. Zager and Evans met at Nebraska Wesleyan University. Starting in the late 1970s with the arrival of the punk movement, there was an explosion in rock bands on the Lincoln scene. In the late 1980s and throughout the 1990s, many notable bands like 13 Nightmares, Leafy Green Things, Opium Taylor, The Holy Ghost, The Gladstones, The New Brass Guns, For Against, The Millions, Charlie Burton, Sideshow, 2 Below, Matthew Sweet and Mercy Rule came from Lincoln. Current notable artists include The Brigandines, The JV All*Stars, An Hobbes, Stonebelly, BlackDoubt, Ideal Cleaners, Straight Outta Junior High, Nick Hardt, Brimstone Howl, The Awkwords, Josh Hoyer & Soul Colossal and Eagle*Seagull. Indie record labels that originated in Lincoln include Wild Records, Caulfield Records and -ismist Recordings. The brothers A.J. Mogis and Mike Mogis also own Presto! Recording Studios, which is located in Lincoln.

In the 1970s, The Zoo Bar in Lincoln, styled after a Chicago blues club, brought in many popular artists from Chicago such as Magic Slim, Bo Diddley and Robert Cray. The venue celebrated its 50th anniversary in 2023.

=== Norfolk ===
The Elkhorn Valley Museum and Research Center houses the Nebraska Music Hall of Fame.

== See also ==
- Arapaho music
- Culture of Omaha, Nebraska
- Indigenous music of North America#Plains
