= Michael Hasel =

German flutist (born 1959)

- Born: December 5, 1959 (age 66); Hofheim, Hesse
- Genres: Classical
- Occupations: Musician, conductor
- Instrument: Flute
- Member of: Berlin Philharmonic
- Formerly of: Frankfurt Radio Symphony Orchestra
- Website: michaelhasel.de

Michael Hasel is a German classical flutist and conductor.

== Career ==
Hasel studied conducting under Francis Travis and Michael Gielen, and studied flute under Aurèle Nicolet at the Hochschule für Musik Freiburg.

His first orchestral role was as flutist with the Frankfurt Radio Symphony Orchestra from 1982 to 1984. He was subsequently appointed by Herbert von Karajan to the Berlin Philharmonic, where he founded the Berlin Philharmonic Wind Quintet in 1988. He has also been principal flute with the Bayreuth Festival Orchestra.

In 1985, he assisted Anton Johannes Braun in developing a patented piccolo. In 1993, Hasel and Rolf Bissinger helped Braun in developing a modern wooden flute.

In 1994, he became a professor of wind ensemble and chamber music at the Hochschule für Musik und Darstellende Kunst Mannheim.
