= Marisa Canales =

Mexican flute player

Marisa Canales (born December 11, 1959) is a Mexican flute player. She was born in Mexico City where she started her musical studies; she later attended the University of the Arts in Philadelphia, then Philadelphia College of Performing Arts (PCPA), where she studied with Adeline Tomasone (Philadelphia Opera and Philadelphia Orchestra), and was awarded a bachelor's degree Magna Cum Laude (1985).

A scholarship granted by the French government allowed her to pursue graduate studies at the National Conservatory of Versailles, France; there she obtained First Prizes in Flute and Chamber Music (1989) working with Jean-Michel Varache (Île-de-France and Lamoureux Orchestras) and with Jean-Claude Montac (Opera Bastille Orchestra). She has also attended master classes with world-famous teachers like James Galway, Jean-Pierre Rampal and Geoffrey Gilbert.

Her musical activities include not only her performances as soloist with orchestras in Mexico but also in chamber ensembles particularly with guitarist Juan Carlos Laguna. The Canales-Laguna duo has assembled a repertoire of new works, many dedicated to them, by leading Latin-American composers.

Canales performs regularly with the leading Mexican orchestras: National Symphony Orchestra, National University Philharmonic, Carlos Chavez Symphony, Xalapa Orchestra, Querétaro Symphony, Mexico City Chamber Ensemble. She has recorded with the London Symphony Orchestra Lalo Schifrin’s “Concierto Caribeño”, a work commissioned for and dedicated to her. She has also premiered and recorded a large number of flute works (over fifty), many written for her by leading American, Mexican and Latin American composers such as Samuel Zyman, Eduardo Gamboa, Eugenio Toussaint, Arturo Márquez, Armando Luna, Ian Krouse, Sean Hickey, and many others. Her CDs have been released by Urtext Digital Classics, Mexico's leading classical label, of which she is founder and artistic director. Marisa is also a distinguished recording producer, whose work has been recognized with a Latin Grammy nomination in 2001.
