= Quintessenz – Leipziger Querflötenensemble =

German flute quintet

Quintessenz Leipzig Flute Ensemble
- Origin: Leipzig, Germany
- Genres: Classical, jazz
- Years active: 1996–present
- Labels: MDG, Genuin
- Members: Anna Garzuly; Jérémie Abergel; Bettine Keyßer; Christian Sprenger; Manfred Ludwig
- Past members: Britta Croissant; Christian Sprenger; Gudrun Hinze; Ute Günther
- Website: www.quintessenz-leipzig.com

Quintessenz Leipzig Flute Ensemble is a flute quintet from Leipzig, Germany. Its members are five musicians of Gewandhausorchester Leipzig, MDR Symphony Orchestra, and Staatskapelle Halle.

== History ==
Quintessenz Leipzig Flute Ensemble was founded in 1996 and was inspired by the works of British a cappella-band King’s Singers, the Bamboozles, and a flute quintet of five students of Trevor Wye.

Quintessenz began arranging their own musical pieces. They used music for quintets of different instruments and also adapted symphonic pieces, piano literature, and completely different music genres. Thus, they began to compile their own programs.

In 1999, Quintessenz recorded their first CD, followed by three more. In 2006, the ensemble was invited by Trevor Wye to the flute festival of the British Flute Society in Manchester. Since then, they have performed at various international festivals, inter alia in New York City in August 2009, hosted by the National Flute Association of the United States.

A few years ago, Quintessenz started to focus on the support of young flutists. In cooperation with the regional music council (Landesmusikrat) and the Jeunesses Musicales Germany they hosted several workshops for flute chamber music.

== Programs ==
Because of their particular music style, there is always a main topic or theme that organizes the repertoire. This theme can be related to both music or composers (Mozartimento), but also countries (America!) or literary themes (Tour de France). In addition to that, Quintessenz has several special programs that combine music and poetry (Hymn to fish, All those birds). For those, they are assisted by professional stage actors who recite poems to the respective topic.

A special form of these programs is the "musical promenade". The audience is invited to walk through the landscape together with "Quintessenz", playing music at different places.

Additional programs are, for example, "A Midsummer Night's Dream" – the program for the Mendelssohn year 2009. Parts of the music of A Midsummer Night's Dream are the frame, replenished with pieces about summer, night, and elves.

== Discography ==
- 1999: Bonsoir
- 2003: Arabesques
- 2006: America!
- 2007: Tour de France
