= Michael John Murphy =

American musician (20th century)

Michael John Murphy is a folk musician based in Omaha, Nebraska. He plays various instruments, including the guitar, piano, and Native American flute. He has been a singer songwriter based out of Omaha since the 1970s.

== Music ==
His lyrics are often socially conscious or spiritual, and he uses personal stories and anecdotes in his shows. He has been writing songs since the 1970s, as noted by the lyrics to song, Liquor Stores, which begins: "I was working at a liquor store in July of '73". He started playing the Native American Flute in about 1983 after his mother, who had Native American ancestors, died.

== Production and studio work ==
Murphy has worked with a number of other well known musicians, including Brulé, Mark Holland, The Young Bucks, and Duane Martin, Sr. Murphy helped produce and does the instrumentation on Martin's 2010 project, Cante Tenza Olowan – Song for the Strong Heart .

== Activism ==
Michael has been involved with the Whiteclay Advisory Committee, a group of activists concerned about alcoholism on the Pine Ridge Reservation in South Dakota and about the sale of alcohol on the border of the reservation in the town of Whiteclay, Nebraska. Along with Canupa Gluha Mani, he performed and produced the music for The Battle for Whiteclay, a documentary about the Whiteclay issue. Murphy has been featured at the Omaha Summer Arts Festival, the Avoca Iowa Folk Festival, and the Lincoln Plainsong Festival. He frequently works with Winnebago leader, Frank LaMere, on the Whiteclay issue and in 2015 recorded a song with LaMere about Whiteclay and Pine Ridge.

== Music education ==
He has taught Native American flute at clinics and colleges in the midwest, especially the Omaha Metropolitan Community College and the Nebraska Indian Community College and St. Augustine Mission in Macy, Nebraska. Murphy is a member of the Nebraska Arts Council and the International Native American Flute Association. He has also taught workshops in flute decoration.

== Discography ==
- Secret Thoughts (1996)
- The Second (1998)
- Sacred Hearts (2002)
- Trail of Tears (2003)
- Peace (2004)
- Honor Songs of the Great White Father (2006)

== See also ==
- Music of Nebraska
