= Bryan Akipa =

Dakota flautist

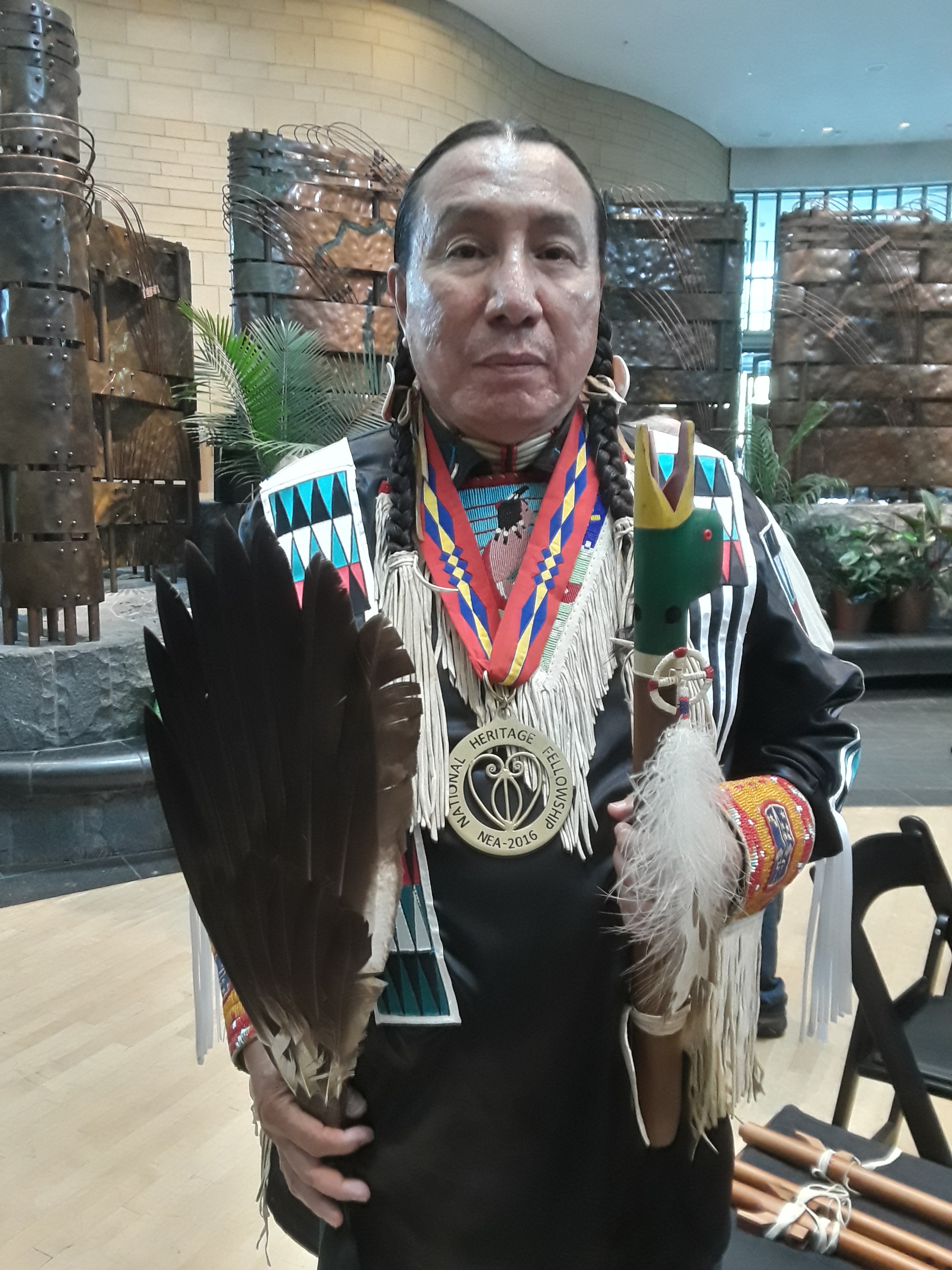
- Akipa after a performance at the National Museum of the American Indian, 2019

Background information
- Occupations: Army veteran, elementary teacher, flute maker, champion traditional dancer
- Instrument: Native American flute

Bryan Akipa (Sisseton Wahpeton Oyate) is a Dakota flautist with five solo albums to date.

He has been a featured artist at A Prairie Awakening, an annual event held at the Kuehn Conservation Area near Earlham, Iowa. He is a citizen of the Sisseton Wahpeton Oyate. He attended the Institute of American Indian Arts. He also studied fine arts with painter Oscar Howe at the University of South Dakota.

== Awards ==
"His CDs have been nominated for several Nammies (Native American Music Awards), including 1998 honors for The Flute Player album, 1999 Thunder Flute (also the Indie awards finalist), 2001 Eagle Dreams, and in 2002 Best Flutist, Best Male Artist. He was a featured player on My Relatives Say by Mary Louise Defender, which won the 2000 NAMA for Best Spoken Word recording."

Akipa was awarded a National Heritage Fellowship by the National Endowment for the Arts in 2016.

== Discography ==
- Mystic Moments. SOAR. 1995.
- Flute Player. Makoche. 1996.
- Thunderflute. SOAR. 1998.
- Eagle Dreams. Makoche. 2001.
- Song of Aspen. Red Cedar Flute. 2005.

=== As contributor ===
- Peter Rowan (1993). Awake Me in the New World. Sugar Hill.
- Goble, Paul (1993). Love Flute: A Story by Paul Goble. Dakotah.
- Brulé (1996). We The People. Natural Visions.
- Brulé (1999). One Nation. Natural Visions.
- Mary Louise Defender Wilson (2001). My Relatives Say. Makoche.
- Brulé (2004). The Collection. Natural Visions.
