= Catherine Ransom Karoly =

American flutist

Catherine Ransom Karoly is an American flutist. She joined the Los Angeles Philharmonic as second flutist in 1996, and was promoted to associate principal flute in March 2009. She has been the first-prize recipient of numerous competitions, including the National Flute Association Young Artist Competition, the Flute Talk National Flute Competition, and the Chicago Flute Society Competition.

In October 2000, Karoly made her solo debut with music director Esa-Pekka Salonen conducting the L.A. Philharmonic in Ibert's Flute Concerto.

Before coming to Los Angeles, Karoly spent three seasons as principal flute of the New World Symphony in Miami, Florida, under music director Michael Tilson Thomas. She appeared as soloist with the NWS on several occasions, including the Mozart G-major Flute Concerto under José-Luis Garcia, the Bach Suite in B minor under Nicholas McGegan, the Nielsen Concerto under Alasdair Neale, and Lukas Foss' Renaissance Concerto with Tilson Thomas conducting.

As a member of the award-winning Dorian Wind Quintet from 1994 to 1996, Karoly appeared regularly on chamber music series throughout the United States. She has participated in numerous music festivals including Marlboro, Tanglewood, and the Spoleto Festival in Italy. In August 2001 she was the featured flutist on a recital at La Jolla Summerfest.

Born in Minneapolis, Minnesota, Catherine Ransom Karoly received a Master of Music degree from the Juilliard School, where she studied with Carol Wincenc. Karoly graduated from the University of Wisconsin–Madison with Phi Beta Kappa honors and was the recipient of a Fulbright Grant to England. Her other teachers include Trevor Wye, Mary Kay Fink, Robert Cole, and Susan Morris DeJong.
