= Kristiyan Koev =

- Born: 1 July 1970 (age 56); Sofia, Bulgaria
- Occupation: Classical flutist
- Website: www.kristiankoev.com

Kristiyan Koev (Bulgarian: Кристиян Коев; 1 July 1970) is a Bulgarian flutist, also known as "Kristiyan Koev – The Golden Flute".

He was born in Sofia in a family of flutists. Both his parents are world-famous flutists - Nikolay Koev and Rositza Ivanova. His father is a flutist and member of the Eolina quartet . His mother made a record of Leo Brouwer's concert.. Kristiyan Koev spent his childhood in Havana, Cuba. His stepfather was Manuel Duchesne Cuzán – professor at Alejandro García Caturla Conservatoire, General Director of the National Symphonic Orchestra of Cuba, Chief of the Musical Department of Symphonic Music from the Management Music at the Ministry of Culture, also head of the staff of Orchestral Direction at the Superior Institute of Art (ISA).

== Education ==
He enrolled at the school of music “Liubomir Pipkov”, Sofia to study flute. After graduating from the music school he started music lessons in Paris, France, with the famous flutist Aurèle Nicolet.

In 1989, he was admitted in the National Music Academy “Prof. Pancho Vladigerov”, Sofia. The same period was invited by Prof. Severino Gazzelloni to proceed his music education at Accademia Nazionale di Santa Cecilia, free of charge and at the same time as a scholarship student at Arts Academy, Rome. For a year and a half he lived in "Boris Hristov" Foundation in Rome.

During his time as a student at Santa Cecilia, Kristian Koev studied with Dante Milozi – The First Flute in the Rome Radio Orchestra. He graduated the Music Academy in four years instead of the typical seven years it would take.

== Awards ==
- First Prize: The National Contest for young instrumentalists “Targovishte”-Bulgaria
- First Prize: The National Contest “Provadia”-Bulgaria
- First Prize and the title Laureate: The International Contest “Spring in Prague”, Italy
- First Prize: Contest of the Rich People for young talents, Milan, Italy
- Honorary Diploma from the Music Forum Tempora Festival
- Honorary Diploma from the Festival Internacional Cervantino
- Honorary Diploma from the Festival Delle Tre Ciminiere
- Honorary Diploma from The Sanremo Music Festival (Festival della canzone italiana)
- Honorary Diploma from the Festival Sofia Music Meeting Italy – Bulgaria – South Korea

== The Golden Flute ==
His flute, usually made of silver, was made of 14-carat gold, especially for him, in the Japanese factory Miyazawa Flutes. The instrument often accompanies his name on the posters. "The Golden Flute" name Kristiyan Koev inherited from his teacher, the Italian soloist, Prof. Severino Gazzelloni.

== Career ==
Experts rank Kristiyan Koev among the six best classic flutists in the world.

At the age of 35, Koev has performed more than 960 concerts in the world theaters. He has played with conductors such as Leonard, Zubin Mehta, Enrique Bátiz – of the Mexican Philharmonic Orchestra, Nanut – of the Taranto Philharmonic orchestra (Italy), Francesco La Vecchia- of the Roman philharmonic orchestra, Patrick Galua, Dante Milozzi – the first flute of the Roman radio, Jesus Medina- A conductor and music director of The UANL Symphony Orchestra in Monterrey, Mexico, Maestro Eduardo Alvarez – founder of the Music School of the Americana University of Acapulco and Music Director of the Symphony Orchestra of the Autonomous University of the State of Hidalgo, Mexico.

As a soloist, Maestro Kristian Koev is an honoured guest of world-famous symphonic orchestras:

“Santa Cecilia”, “Regionale Lazio”, “La internazionale” (Rome), “San Remo”, “Аutonoma Siciliana”(Palermo), “Delle Ciminiere" (Catania), “Como”, ”Soceta de i concerti”(Milano), “Solisti Veneti" (Venecia), "Metropolitan", "Caschais", "Opera"(Lisabon), "Recionale" (Porto), "Statale”(Madeira), The Bellas Artes Chamber Orchestra of Mexico city, Palacio de Bellas Artes, and many others.

Kristiyan Koev performed a flute solo concert in honor of Charles, Prince of Wales during his diplomatic visit in Italy and performed a solo concert at the birthday celebration of Pope John Paul II. The concert was held at Santa Maria Degli Angelli temple in Rome.

== Music Albums ==
'2007 – Vivaldi: Quattro concerti''
• Tempesta di Mare
• Il Cardellino
• Concerto in Do Minor
• La Notte

2007 – Solisti di Napoli classical soundtracks
• Conductor Maestra Susana Peshetti
• Kristian Koev, Flute

== Performance in foreign productions ==
• Live Concert for Flute by Raynike in Ancara Music Hall, Turkey; Emil Tabakov, conductor; Kristian Koev, flute
• Interpretando Rodrigo; Music by Joaquin Rodrigo with Orchestra Nazionale di Radio Sofia, Stefano Trasimeni, conductor, Kristian Koev, flute, Alessandro De Pau, guitar
• Gianni Possio Orchestral Works – concert for clavicembalo and harp – Second concert for flute and orchestra; The Bulgarian Radio Symphony Orchestra; Aldo Tarchetti; Kristian Koev (flauto); Todor Petrov (clavicembalo)

== Audio ==
- Kristian Koev's YouTube Channel
