= Hemapala Perera =

Sri Lankan musician and flautist

Hemapala Perera හේමපාල පෙරේරා
- Born: Vithanage Hemapala Perera; 20 October 1942 (age 83); Badulla, Sri Lanka
- Spouse: Kusuma Perera (m. 1976)
- Children: 2
- Parents: Romiel Perera (father); Nanda Perera (mother)
- Awards: Kala Bhushana
- Musical career
- Genres: Pop; soul; rhythm and blues; Indian classical music
- Instruments: Flute, Guitar
- Years active: 1967–present
- Labels: Nilwala; MEntertainment

Kala Bhushana Vithanage Hemapala Perera (born on 20 October 1942 as හේමපාල පෙරේරා [Sinhala]), popularly known as Hemapala Master, is a musician and renowned flautist in Sri Lankan cinema, theater and television.

== Early and personal life ==
He was born on 20 October 1942 in Pinnarawa village, Badulla as the youngest in a family with five siblings. He has three elder sisters and two elder brothers. His father was Romiel Perera and mother was Nanda Perera. When Hemapala was three years old, his parents admitted him to the primary section of the convent in the village with the intention of providing him with an education. He had been studying the alphabet for about a year, and had the opportunity to enter the first year at the age of four. At that time, the first children admitted to the first grade were given the required immunizations at school.

Hemapala was also given the same immunizations on the day of the school holidays. Hemapala was poisoned by the vaccine and as a result, spots appeared all over his body. He was later admitted to the Badulla Hospital where he was treated for poisoning. The doctors decided to give 24 injections at the hospital. All wounds were cut with scissors. After about 12 injections, the flesh began to appear and cover in one eye. Chloroform was applied and three operations were performed on the eyes. But unfortunately the drug also poisoned his body and he lost his sight. At the age of nine, both eyes became blind. With a sudden illness, his education was disrupted.

In 1975, Hemapala met his wife Kusuma Perera who is from Venivelkola village in Kahathuduwa. She was a fan of him where she sent letters to him. Later they met, got to know each other and got married in 1976. The couple has one daughter and one son.

== Career ==
Although there was no one involved in music at Hemapala's house, he realized that his elder brother had brought some musical instruments and was preparing to learn music. At that time, Hemapala was listening intently as his brother practiced music at night. Hemapala had the ability to play musical instruments such as the flute, mouth organ and the Japanese mandolin. It was his father who developed that self-taught knowledge and later made him a talented musician.

At that time his elder brother was studying music with under J.M. Amaratunga, who was the son of Sadiris Master. His father brought Amaratunga home and taught classical music to Hemapala. He first learned the tabla from that teacher. He did not try to teach new musical instruments. He taught Hemapala to play the musical instruments he know on an academic level. Amaratunga taught him to recognize vocal chords, the differences between rhythmic, simple and classical music, and how to use them in society. Hemapala learned music from him for eleven years until 1964.

Although Hemapala could not watch the movies, his music teacher Amaratunga took him to watch the movie 'Dulari' and told the story from beginning to end. However, Amaratunga was a little strict and after a while there were various disputes between teacher and Hemapala. So in 1964, Hemapala left the teacher. In the meantime, he received a scholarship to study music further, but he missed that opportunity too. However, he met the famous musician Ananda Perera, through a friend. After recognizing Hemapala's talents, Ananda introduced him to Prof. Ediriweera Sarachchandra. Later, Sarachchandra recorded a band he played and gave it to Neville Jayawardena, the then director of the radio station. With that, Hemapala got the opportunity to go on the radio.

On September 28, 1968, at 10.15 pm, the first radio broadcast of Hemapala's flute music was played. In 1969, there was a rating in the academic section of the radio. At that time Hemapala was the only excellent flautist in Sri Lanka. In 1975, a re-ranking was done and he got the same situation as before. At that time he was the only radio player to present classical music on five different instruments. Hemapala also introduced the tradition of playing Hindustani theatrical music on guitar and mandolin to Sri Lanka for the first time. After graduation, he received a half-hour program each month and got the opportunity to participate in music concerts organized by the radio.

In the year 1977, he came to live in Colombo. In the meantime he met Chandrika Siriwardena's husband, Anton Alwis. Upon his introduction, the president Ranasinghe Premadasa gave him a house on Malwatta Road, Colombo in 1979. At the same time, Hemapala met popular songstress Sujatha Aththanayaka where he involved in her first recordings. Also, when he met Sarath Dassanayake and Stanley Peiris, he became a popular flautist in Sri Lankan music industry. He also did a one-man show called Sangeeth Bhawana. In 1986, C.S. Jayasekara invited him to teach the subject of flutes at the University of the Aesthetics. He worked there for about twenty years. But later he left the teaching due to protests from various people.

On 30 June 2016, the musical program Sathsara Ananda featuring Hemapala Perera playing the flute was held on June 30 at 6.30 pm at the Ananda Samarakoon Studio of the Sri Lanka Broadcasting Corporation (SLBC). He is also a lecturer at the University of the Visual and Performing Arts and the University of Sri Jayewardenepura.
