= Doug Campbell (musician) =

American guitarist

Doug Campbell was a rock and roll guitarist from Nebraska, and the recipient of the 2000 Ron Tuccitto Award from the Nebraska Music Hall of Fame.

== See also ==
- Music of Nebraska
