= Paolo Taballione =

- Born: 1981 (age 44–45); Rome, Italy
- Genres: Classical
- Occupations: Flautist, professor
- Instrument: Flute
- Years active: 2000s–present
- Member of: Bavarian State Opera
- Formerly of: Orchestra del Maggio Musicale Fiorentino, Luigi Cherubini Youth Orchestra

Paolo Taballione (born 1981 in Rome, Italy) is an Italian flutist and professor. He is internationally recognized as a soloist, chamber musician, and principal flutist of the Bavarian State Opera in Munich, Germany. Since 2018, he has served as a professor of flute at the Mozarteum University in Salzburg, Austria.

== Early life and education ==
Taballione was born in Rome and began studying the flute at a young age. He graduated from the Conservatorio Santa Cecilia in Rome in 2001 under the guidance of G. Schiavone. He continued his studies at the Conservatoire Supérieur de Musique de Genève, earning a Diplôme de Soliste under Jacques Zoon.

== Career ==
In 2004, Taballione was appointed principal flute of the Orchestra del Maggio Musicale Fiorentino under conductor Zubin Mehta. Since 2008, he has served as principal flutist of the Bavarian State Opera.

He has performed in major concert halls around the world, including:

- Vienna Musikverein
- Concertgebouw, Amsterdam
- Philharmonie Berlin
- Teatro alla Scala, Milan
- Suntory Hall, Tokyo

Taballione has collaborated with renowned conductors such as Zubin Mehta, Riccardo Muti, Daniel Barenboim, Kent Nagano, and Kirill Petrenko.

== Teaching ==
In 2018, Taballione became a professor of flute at the Mozarteum University Salzburg. He also teaches international masterclasses in Europe, Asia, and the Americas.

== Style and contributions ==
Taballione is noted for his nuanced tonal palette and high level of technical proficiency. He regularly incorporates transcriptions and newly composed works into his repertoire, demonstrating a sustained commitment to the advancement of contemporary flute literature.

== Discography ==
Taballione has released recordings featuring both traditional and contemporary works for flute. Some of his performances have been broadcast by European classical music stations.
