= Seiya Ueno =

Japanese flutist (born 1989)

- Born: August 30, 1989 (age 37); Suginami, Japan
- Genres: Classical
- Occupation: Soloist
- Instrument: Flute

Seiya Ueno (上野 星矢, Ueno Seiya; born August 30, 1989) is a Japanese flutist and soloist.

== Career ==
Ueno began playing the flute at the age of 9. He studied at the Tokyo University of the Arts under Yuko Yamada and Megumi Horie, before studying at the Conservatoire de Paris under Philippe Bernold, Vincent Lucas, and Sophie Cherrier.

He won the 2008 Jean-Pierre Rampal International Competition, as well as first prize at the 59th Student Music Competition of Japan, first prize at the 5th Japan Wind and Percussion Competition, first prize at the 5th Osaka International Music Competition, and second prize at the 79th Music Competition of Japan. He was also a first prize winner at the 2014 Young Concert Artists International Auditions.

He has performed as a soloist with the Tokyo Symphony Orchestra, Czech Philharmonic Octet, New Japan Philharmonic, and Saito Kinen Orchestra.

He is a flute professor at the Osaka College of Music, and was a jury member at the 2021 Cluj International Music Competition.
