= Kuehn Conservation Area =

Park in Iowa, United States

Coordinates: 41°33′47″N 94°7′55″W

Kuehn Conservation Area is park near Earlham, Iowa managed by the Dallas County Conservation Board. The park provides a restored prairie, bird watching areas, primitive camping, and hiking trails. The park was formed in 1982 from a 300-acre (1.2 km^{2}) donation by Gerald Kuehn, which was his residence during his youth. Subsequent acquisitions has brought the park to almost 600 acres (2.4 km^{2}).

== Bear Creek Nature Center ==
The Bear Creek Nature Center is an indoor classroom with numerous wildlife displays. The center is visited by children from schools across the state to further environmental and ecological education. The center is open by appointment only.

== A Prairie Awakening ==
This is an annual event co-founded with the help of Maria Pearson. The event is free and supported by donations from visitors, non-profit organizations and public funds. It is held on the weekend after Labor Day, starting with youth programs on Friday and on Saturday, a traditional powwow and Native American flute playing, usually by Bryan Akipa. Public participation is central to this alcohol-free event as anybody is welcome to dance at the powwow or participate in the activities.
