= Sébastian Jacot =

Swiss flutist (born 1987)

- Born: August 12, 1987 (age 38); Geneva, Switzerland
- Genres: Classical
- Occupation: Musician
- Instrument: Flute
- Formerly of: Hong Kong Philharmonic Orchestra; Mozart Orchestra; Mahler Chamber Orchestra; Munich Chamber Orchestra; Saito Kinen Orchestra; Leipzig Gewandhaus Orchestra; Berlin Philharmonic
- Website: sebastianjacot.com

Sébastian Jacot is a Swiss classical flutist. He was one of the principal flutists of the Berlin Philharmonic Orchestra from November 2022 to November 2024.

== Early life ==
Jacot began playing flute at age 8. He studied under Isabelle Giraud and Jacques Zoon, graduating from the Conservatoire de musique de Genève in 2010.

== Career ==
At age 18, Jacot was appointed assistant principal flute of the Hong Kong Philharmonic Orchestra under Edo de Waart. He held this position for two years, subsequently playing with the Mozart Orchestra under Claudio Abbado, the Mahler Chamber Orchestra, the Munich Chamber Orchestra, and the Saito Kinen Orchestra. He was a jury member at the 2021 Cluj International Music Competition.

In May 2022, Jacot won the position of principal flute with the Berlin Philharmonic Orchestra, replacing Mathieu Dufour. Jacot was previously with the Leipzig Gewandhaus Orchestra. He later left the orchestra in November 2024 and was replaced by Stefán Ragnar Höskuldsson.

== Awards ==
Jacot won the first-place prize at the 2013 Kobe International Flute Competition, the first-place prize and "Best Interpretation of a Contemporary Creation" at the 2014 Carl Nielsen International Flute Competition, and the first-place prize at the 2015 ARD International Music Competition.

Jacot plays one of three cocus wooden Haynes made in 1999, a 14k custom-made golden Parmenon, and a silver Miyasawa.
