= Nina Assimakopoulos =

American recording artist and professor

- Occupations: Flutist, recording artist, professor
- Instrument: Flute
- Website: www.ninaassimakopoulos.info

Nina Assimakopoulos is a flutist from United States, recording artist, and professor. She is the assistant professor of Flute at West Virginia University.

== Discography ==
Nina Assimakopoulos has recorded five albums of flute music.

Album	Label	Release date
Flute Impressions	Euterpe Records	2002
Arcadian Murmurs: Pan in Pieces	Euterpe Records	2004
Points of Entry - The Laurels Project, Volume 1	Capstone Records	2005
Points of Entry - The Laurels Project, Volume 2	Capstone Records	2007
Vãyu: Multi-Cultural Flute Solos from the Twenty-First Century	AMP Recordings	2015
