= Aurèle Nicolet =

Swiss flautist

- Born: 22 January 1926; Neuchâtel, Switzerland
- Died: 29 January 2016 (aged 90) Freiburg im Breisgau, Germany
- Genres: Classical
- Occupation: Flautist
- Instrument: Flute
- Years active: 1948–2016
- Website: Aurèle Nicolet

Aurèle Nicolet (22 January 1926 – 29 January 2016) was a Swiss flautist. He was considered one of the world's best flute players of the late twentieth century.

He performed in various international concerts. A number of composers wrote music especially for him, including Josef Tal, Tōru Takemitsu, György Ligeti, Krzysztof Meyer, and Edison Denisov.

His pupils include Emmanuel Pahud, Carlos Bruneel, Michael Faust, Pedro Eustache, Thierry Fischer, Irena Grafenauer, Huáscar Barradas, Kristiyan Koev, Jadwiga Kotnowska, Robert Langevin, Tom Ottar Andreassen, Marina Piccinini, Kaspar Zehnder and Ariel Zuckermann.

He died at the age of 90 in 2016 in Freiburg im Breisgau, Germany.

== Career ==
He was a flautist in orchestras in Winterthur and Zurich from 1948 to 1950. He was solo flautist for the Berlin Philharmonic Orchestra from 1950 to 1959. He was a professor in the Academy for Music in Berlin from 1952 to 1965. He was head of the Master Class at Freiburg Conservatory from 1965 to 1981.

== Awards and prizes ==
In 1947, at the age of 21, he was awarded First Prize for flute from Paris Conservatory.

In 1948 he won First Prize at Geneva International Music Competition.

== Selected discography ==
- Bach: The Complete Sonatas for Flute
- Luigi Boccherini/Joseph Martin Kraus: Flute Quintets
- François-Joseph Gossec: 6 Flute Quartets
- Wolfgang Amadeus Mozart: 4 Flute Quartets
- Anton Reicha: 3 Quartets, Op. 98
- Louis Spohr: Concertante No. 2; Mozart: Concerto for Flute and Harp; Oboe Concertos
- Antonio Vivaldi: 6 Flute Concertos, Op. 10
