= Andreas Blau =

German flutist (born 1949)

- Born: 6 February 1949 (age 77); Schmargendorf, Germany
- Genres: Classical
- Instrument: Flute
- Member of: The 14 Berlin Flutes
- Formerly of: Berlin Philharmonic

Andreas Blau is a German classical flutist. He is a former principal flutist of the Berlin Philharmonic.

== Early life ==
Blau's father was a violinist with the Berlin Philharmonic, joining the orchestra in 1948, a year before Andreas was born. Blau auditioned for principal flute and joined the orchestra at the age of 20 after brief studies at the Hochschule für Musik in Berlin, the Salzburg Mozarteum, and in the United States, also receiving several international awards.

== Career ==
=== Performing ===
As a soloist, he performed under Herbert von Karajan, David Oistrach, Yehudi Menuhin, Claudio Abbado, and Sir Simon Rattle.

He is the founder and director of The 14 Berlin Flutes, an ensemble formed in 1996 composed entirely of flute players from various Berlin orchestras. The ensemble plays various instruments in the flute family, ranging from the piccolo to the contrabass flute.

Blau was the principal flute of the Berlin Philharmonic since 1969 before retiring in June 2015 after 46 years. He was succeeded by Mathieu Dufour from the Chicago Symphony.

=== Teaching ===
Since 1973, he has been a flute professor and many of his students are active in major orchestras around the world. He also teaches master classes in many countries and has been invited to numerous international competitions as a jury member. In 2005, Blau was appointed Honorary Professor at the Shanghai Conservatory of Music.

== Personal life ==
Blau's father-in-law was Fritz Wesenigk (24 April 1923 – 7 March 2009), a trumpet player who was also in the Berlin Philharmonic. Blau's daughter Alexandra is married to Albrecht Mayer, the orchestra's principal oboist.
