= Odell Borg =

- Origin: Patagonia, Arizona, United States
- Genres: Native Flute
- Occupation(s): Flute Maker, Music Producer
- Instrument: Native Flute
- Years active: 1990–present
- Labels: High Spirits Music
- Website: www.highspirits.com

Odell Borg is a native flute maker, teacher, and record producer. He has produced records with Jan 'Looking Wolf', Zach Farley, Harry Seavey, Travis Terry, and Naomi Littletree. Before making flutes, Odell was a leather craftsman and a draftsman. In 1988, Odell received his first native flute as a gift, and after a few of years playing it he began making flutes of his own.

Odell's first flute workshop began in a one-car garage in Solana Beach, California which became High Spirits Flutes. Odell relocated High Spirits Flutes to Patagonia, Arizona where he continues handcrafting flutes. High Spirits Flutes are crafted from single piece of wood, and are most often created using sustainably harvested, domestic, tonal woods.

== Filmography ==
- How to Play Native American Flute (1995)
- Intermediate Techniques for Native American Flutes (1995)
