= Jadwiga Kotnowska =

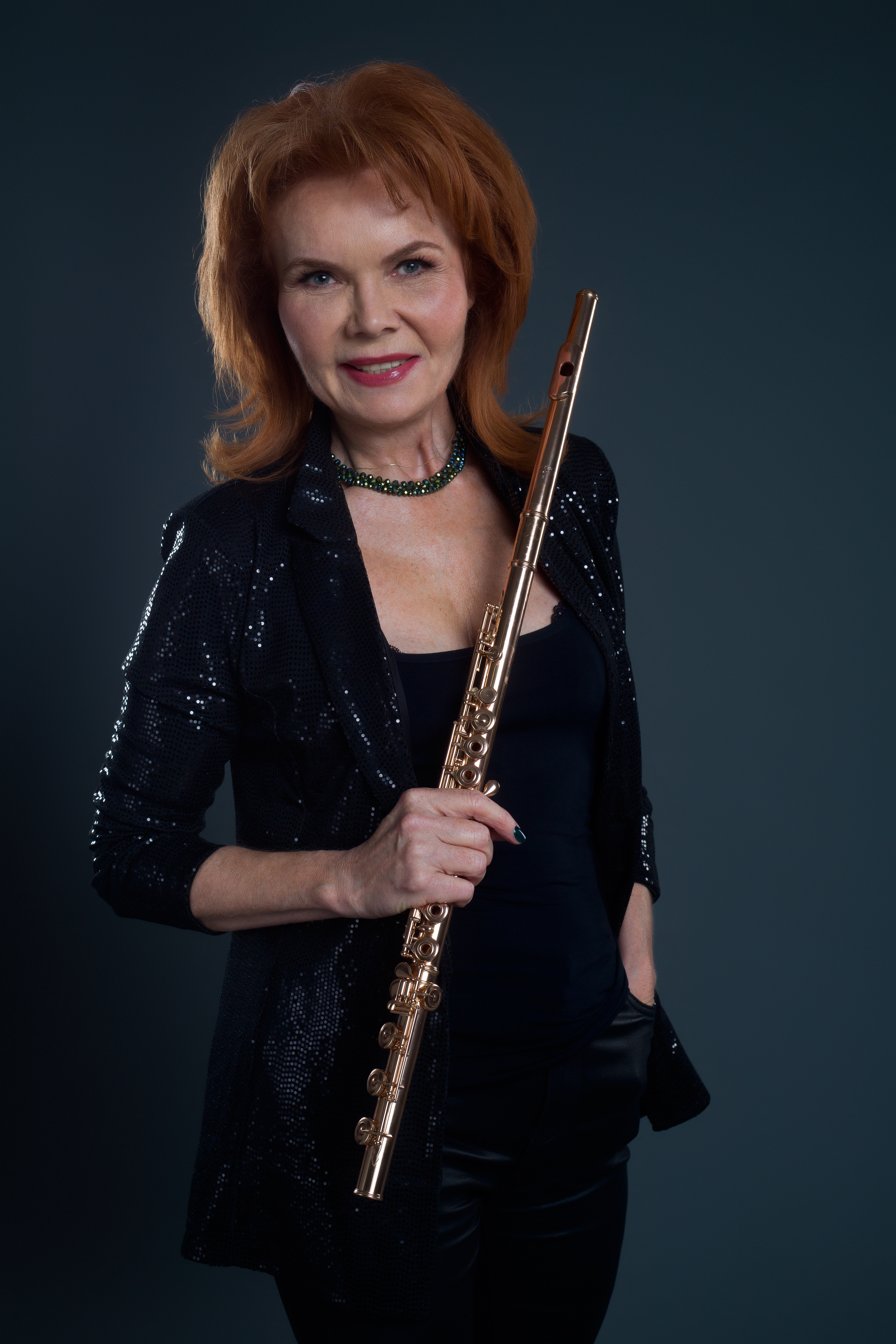

Background information
- Birth name: Jadwiga Kotnowska
- Born: August 18, 1957 (age 67); Warsaw, Republic of Poland
- Genres: Classical
- Occupation: Flautist
- Instrument: Flute
- Website: www.jadwigakotnowska.com

Jadwiga Kotnowska is a Polish flautist. A winner of many important international competitions, she was educated in Poland, Switzerland and France. She studied flute with Aurèle Nicolet, Alain Marion and Jean-Pierre Rampal. Today, in turn, she is often invited to give Master Classes in flute performance in Poland, France, Scandinavia, United States and, recently, in Great Britain at the Royal College of Music.

In her native Poland she is usually the soloist of choice for premieres of flute concerti of contemporary composers such as K. Penderecki, H.M.Górecki and others. Many of these compositions are written specifically for her. Recently she performed the world premiere of H.M.Górecki's Flute Concerto with the National Radio Symphony Orchestra in Katowice. The Concerto is dedicated to the artist. When K. Penderecki took his Flute Concerto to Germany as conductor, he insisted on Ms. Kotnowska performing as the soloist.

National cultural institutions have requested Ms. Kotnowska to perform repertoire of their native composers. She was selected to record the definitive performance of some of Boulez' flute compositions for the "French National Broadcasting Organization" and was the soloist of choice in the performance of Joaquín Rodrigo Concierto Pastorale at his Birthday Concert in Valencia in his presence.

She has appeared as a soloist with orchestras such as the Berliner Philharmoniker, the Moscow Philharmonic and Chamber Orchestras, the Warsaw Philharmonic Orchestra, the Polish National Radio Orchestra and many others. She has been First Solo Flautist with the Gulbekian Symphony Orchestra in Lisbon and the Royal Flemish in Antwerp.

Ms. Kotnowska tours extensively with recital programs, both with an array of accompanying instruments (harp, guitar, piano) and with early music, chamber and jazz ensembles. She appeared in the Lincoln Center, the Purcell Room in the Park Lane Series, the Tivoli Theatre, Grieg Hall in Bergen Festival and other prestigious venues in Europe, the United States, Asia and Middle East.

In addition to her classical and contemporary repertoire, Ms. Kotnowska regularly cooperates with Baroque ensembles. She produced and recorded a rare flute version of the Vivaldi Four Seasons (Tonpress) and her other recordings appeared on Polskie Nagrania, MDG, Scotstown Music and Quantum labels.

== General references ==
Real Flute: Jadwiga Kotnowska
