= Dieter Flury =

Swiss flutist (born 1952)

- Born: July 8, 1952 (age 74); Küsnacht, Switzerland
- Genres: Classical
- Instrument: Flute
- Formerly of: Vienna Philharmonic

Dieter Flury (born July 8, 1952) is a Swiss classical flutist who was the principal flute of the Vienna Philharmonic from 1981 to 2017. He also served as the orchestra's managing director from 2005 to 2014.

== Early life ==
Flury studied with Hans Meyer and André Jaunet at the Zurich University of Music, where he graduated in 1976. He also completed a mathematics degree at the same time at ETH Zurich.

== Career ==
Flury joined the Vienna State Opera Orchestra in September 1977 and the Vienna Philharmonic in 1981 as the principal flute. He was succeeded by Silvia Careddu in 2017.

He has been a full-time professor at the University of Fine Arts in Graz, Austria since 1996.

== Controversy ==
Flury has sparked controversy over comments that accepting women and/or people of color into the Vienna Philharmonic takes away from the musical tradition of the orchestra and that musicians outside of Europe do not have the same standards. In 1996, he commented:

From the beginning, we have spoken of the special Viennese qualities.... The way we make music here is... something that has a lot to do with the soul. The soul does not let itself be separated from the cultural roots that we have here in central Europe. And it also doesn't allow itself to be separated from gender... Therefore, I am convinced that it is worthwhile to accept this racist and sexist irritation, because something produced by a superficial understanding of human rights would not have the same standards.

He also told Westdeutscher Rundfunk that accepting women would be "gambling with the emotional unity that this organism currently has".
