= José María del Carmen Ribas =

Spanish flautist (1796 – 1861)

José María del Carmen Ribas (16 July 1796 – 1 July 1861) was a Spanish flautist, resident in London for much of his career. He also composed works for the flute, and was a clarinettist.

== Life ==
Ribas was born in Burgos, son of a military musician, and during childhood travelled with him. Later during the Peninsular War he was taken prisoner by the French army; he was rescued by British forces, and under the Duke of Wellington he took part in the Battle of Toulouse.

After leaving the army he settled in Porto, where his family lived, and studied the flute. In 1825 he became first flute at the Teatro Nacional de São Carlos in Lisbon; he also played first clarinet at the Philharmonic Society of Porto.

In late 1825 Ribas moved to London. He played at the King's Theatre, and performed at concerts in the Hanover Square Rooms. In 1837, on the death of Charles Nicholson, he was appointed principal flute in concerts of the Philharmonic Society, and subsequently became known as the best orchestral flautist in London. He was the first to play the Scherzo solo in Mendelssohn's Midsummer Night's Dream in England, at a Philhamonic concert in 1842. The composer was so pleased at the rehearsal that he asked Ribas to play it three times, saying that he had no idea it would be so effective.

He was interested in the design of flutes: his "Ribas System" flute, made in collaboration with Scott of Edinburgh, gained a prize at the Great Exhibition of 1851.

During his years of residence in England, he occasionally made trips to other countries, performing in Paris, Lisbon, Porto and Madrid. He left England permanently in 1851, after a farewell concert on 7 August, and returned to Porto, where he died in 1861.

== Works ==
Many compositions by Ribas, including several for flute and piano, and for flute duet, were published in London between 1831 and 1843.
