= Ken LaCosse =

American Shakuhachi maker

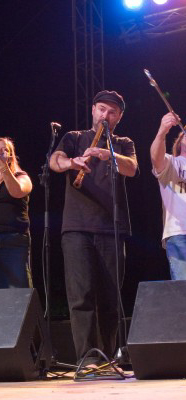
Ken LaCosse performing with Horns of Dillema and Violent Femmes. San Jose, CA.

Ken LaCosse (April 9, 1960, in San Jose, California – June 28, 2019, in San Francisco, California) was an American maker of the shakuhachi (Japanese bamboo flute). He is known particularly for developing a large, wide bore style of shakuhachi called Taimu, with input from shakuhachi player Brian Ritchie.

== Recordings ==
2007 - Taimu - Brian Tairaku Ritchie and Shakuhachi Club MKE (Producer)
