= T. N. Sivakumar =

T.N.Sivakumar
- T.N.Sivakumar

Background information
- Born: 19 September 1957 (age 67); Thalainayar, Tamil Nadu, India
- Genres: Carnatic classical music, film score
- Occupation: Flutist
- Instrument(s): Venu, Flute
- Years active: 1975-current

Thalainayar Narayanaswamy Sivakumar (T. N. Sivakumar) is a visually challenged carnatic flutist guru from Chennai. He is a disciple of Sri T. R. Mahalingam. He has performed in various cultural concerts across the globe. He was told by Kanchi Paramacharyar H.H.Chandrashekara saraswathy that he would be leading the rest of his life with a bamboo stick; (South Indian bamboo flute venu). Sri. Sivakumar lost his father at an early age and was brought up by his mother. His mother was very well versed in carnatic music who was his first teacher. Sri.Sivakumar started learning vocal music from his mother and started learning the flute from the age of seventeen. He started learning many songs just by listening to the radio. She contributed a lot by taking her visually challenged son everywhere to learn music taught him to play songs in a particular style. He mastered many songs composed in a way his mother sang.

== About ==
Sri Sivakumar was trained by flute maestro Sri T. R. Mahalingam, who was also his maternal uncle. He was trained at the Government Music College, Madras (Chennai) by Smt. T. R. Navaneetham for a period of 3 years, where he went on to get his Diploma titled "Vadya Visarada". For a period of 10 years (1976 to 1985), he was also trained by Sri Prapancham Sitaram.

Apart from Carnatic music, Sivakumar also learnt Hindustani music under Sri Krishna Nandhan. He learnt to play film music from Sri P S Divakar for 2 years. He became handicapped as both his eyes were hurt in an accident which led to retina damage. His preliminary education in music was under his mother's guidance for the first 5 years.

He continues to train students in flute and keyboard. He has trained around 2000 students over the past years. He has traveled around the globe and given concerts in America, South Africa and Europe.

== Awards and achievements ==
He was awarded the "Sangeetha Shiromani, D.U.E.M.S". His first Arangetram was on 1 March 1977 at Thygaraja Vidwad Samajam, accompanied by Sri B.A. Chidambaranathan (A.I.R) on the violin and Sri Rajam on the Mridangam. His second performance was at Sadguru Sri Thyagaraja aradhana, Thiruvayaru on 11 January 1978 in the presence of Sri Kunnakudi Vaidyanathan. He has also left his imprint in film music. One can hear his flute in films like "His Highness Abdullah" (Malayalam) and "Nizhalgal" (Tamil).
