= Louise Bellavance =

Quebecoise social worker

Louise Bellavance CM CQ
- Born: 1943 (age 82–83); Rimouski, Quebec, Canada
- Education: Université Laval

Sister Louise Bellavance CM CQ (born 1943) is a Québécoise social worker particularly known for her service to disadvantaged people with hearing disabilities. She is a nun of the Sisters of Charity of Quebec.

== Biography ==
Sister Louise Bellavance was responsible for living units at the Mont-d'Youville Visitor Centre in Quebec City and the Mgr Courchesne Institute in Rimouski from 1963 to 1974. She then began as a psychosocial worker for the Social Services Centre of Quebec, working with children and deaf adults. Bellavance graduated from the Université de Sherbrooke with a bachelor's degree in social work in 1979.

In 1979 Bellavance helped found the Charlesbourg Institute of the Deaf and also Handi A (now Centre Signes d'Espoir), the only community centre in Quebec for deaf adults with disabilities. In 1986 she founded Auberge des Sourds, a home for deaf people with multiple disabilities. These organizations seek to impart life skills and help people integrate into their communities, understanding the isolation and rejection experienced due to communication difficulties. She helped found the Regional Interpretation Service of Eastern Quebec in 1988 and a second home for deaf people in 2002. To help fund these projects she wrote the book Des gestes pour le dire (1995) and helped set up the Signes d'Espoir Foundation.

In 1991 Bellavance completed a master's degree in social work from Université Laval. She is chair of the board of directors of Handi A and was vice-chair of the board of directors of the Foundation of the Deaf of Quebec.

Bellavance was made a member of the Order of Canada in 2000 and a Chevalière of the Ordre national du Québec in 2005.

== Publications ==
- Des gestes pour le dire (in French). Éditions Anne Sigier. 1995.

== Honours ==
- 1996 – Médaille Georges-Henri-Lévesque, Université Laval
- 2000 – Member of the Order of Canada
- 2000 – Merite Centraide, Centraide Quebec
- 2002 – Queen Elizabeth II Golden Jubilee Medal
- 2005 – Chevalière of the Ordre national du Québec
- 2005 – Médaille Gloire de l'Escolle, Université Laval
- 2010 – Member of the Académie des Grands Québécois, Quebec City Chamber of Commerce

== See also ==
- Quebec Sign Language (LSQ)
