= Silvia Careddu =

Italian flutist (born 1977)

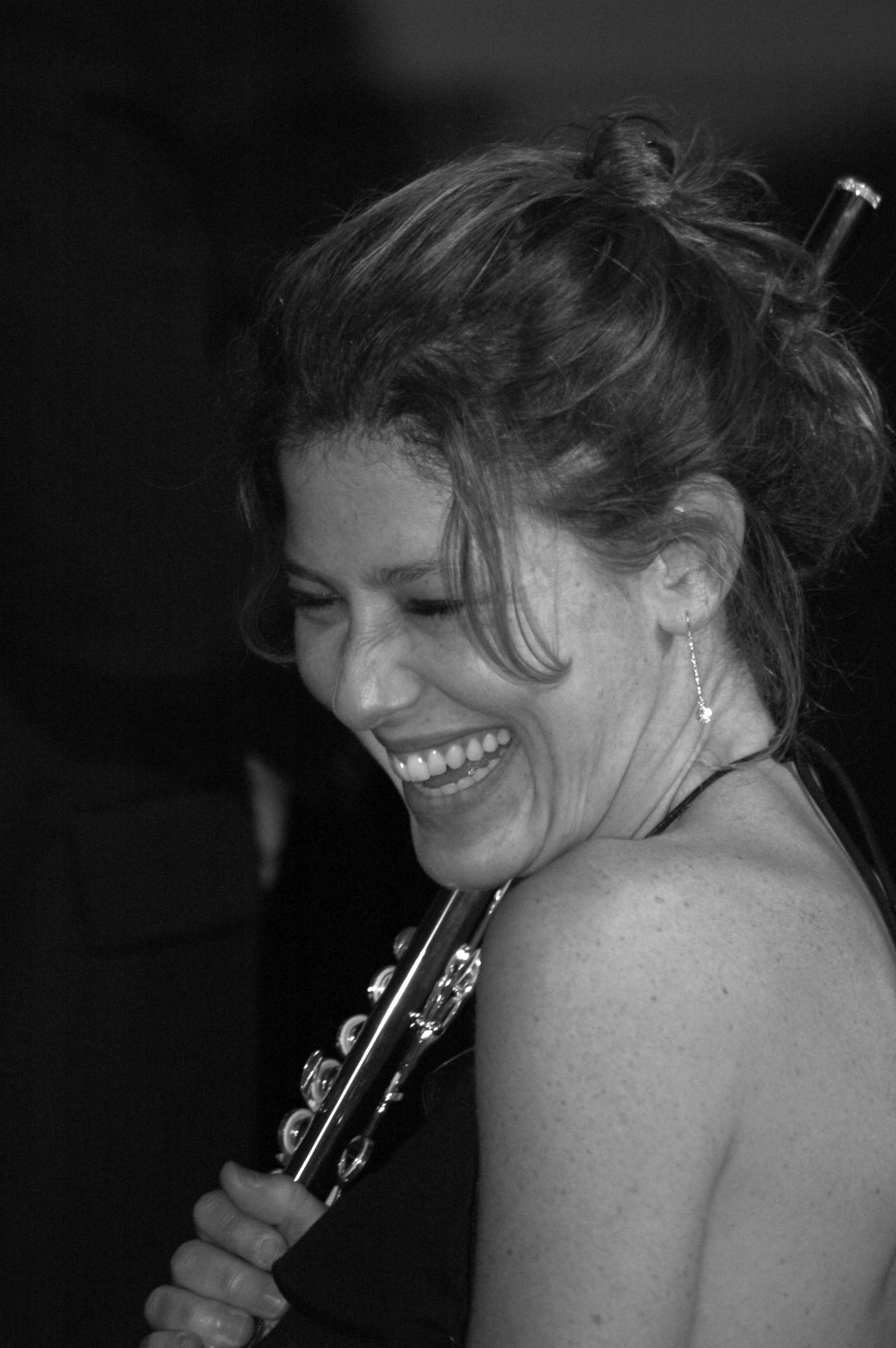

Background information
- Born: March 5, 1977 (age 49); Cagliari, Italy
- Genre: Classical
- Occupations: Musician, professor
- Instrument: Flute
- Member of: Orchestre National de France
- Formerly of: Konzerthausorchester Berlin; Vienna Philharmonic
- Website: silviacareddu.com

Silvia Careddu is an Italian flutist.

== Career ==
Careddu studied at the Conservatoire de Paris, graduating with distinctions. She then won first prize at the 2001 Geneva International Music Competition.

She has performed as guest principal with the Berlin Philharmonic, London Symphony Orchestra, Mahler Chamber Orchestra, Bavarian Radio Symphony Orchestra, Chamber Orchestra of Europe, and the Budapest Festival Orchestra.

In September 2016, she won the position of principal flutist with the Vienna Philharmonic, replacing the retiring Dieter Flury. She began playing with the orchestra in August 2017 following Flury's retirement. She was previously the principal flutist of the Konzerthausorchester Berlin for 10 years.

In January 2019, she was announced to have failed her trial period with the Vienna Philharmonic (narrowly missing the required votes to continue) and left the orchestra at the end of the season. She returned briefly in September to substitute for her incoming replacement, whose start date was delayed.

In March 2021, she was appointed as the principal flutist of the Orchestre National de France.

She has been a flute professor at Conservatoire de Strasbourg and Hochschule für Musik Hanns Eisler Berlin.
