= T. S. Sankaran =

Indian Carnatic flautist

T. S. Sankaran (1930–2015) was an Indian Carnatic instrumentalist (flute).

T S Sankaran was one of the foremost disciples of the legendary 'Flute Mali' - T R Mahalingam. He is the recipient of several awards including the Sangeet Natak Akademi Award for Carnatic music (instrumental) for the year 1999-2000 and Kalaimamani awarded by the Government of Tamil Nadu, to name a few.
