= Ulrich Müller-Doppler =

German flutist

Ulrich Georg Müller-Doppler (born 7 August 1962, according to other sources 1961 in Cologne) is a German flutist. He has been professor for flute at Liceo de Cagayan University in the Philippines since June 2013.

== Life ==
Ulrich Müller-Doppler comes from the family of flutists and composers Albert Franz Doppler and Karl Doppler. He began his musical education at the age of four and studied with Walter Jeschke in Duisburg, Mathias Rütters in Essen and Jean Michel Tanguy in Brussels. He had private lessons and master classes with Jean-Pierre Rampal in Paris. He graduated with a Diplôme Supérieur by Jean Michel Tanguy in Royal Conservatory of Brussels from. He also attended master classes with Peter Lukas Graf und Andras Adorjan.

He played with various orchestras such as the Berlin Philharmonic, the Folkwang Chamber Orchestra in Essen, the Stuttgart Chamber Orchestra, the Rome Festival Orchestra under Claudio Abbado, and the Orchestre National de Belgique. He performed as a soloist and chamber musician at various festivals: among others, at the 1996 International Flute Festival in Rome (Academia de Flautista) and 1998 at the International Flute Association of America with concerts and master classes in Boston, Atlanta and New Orleans.

He is a soloist and member of chamber music trio Le Trio de Bruxelles that he founded with Jean Michel Tanguy and Erich Faltermeier. With the Trio de Bruxelles, he toured to Korea in 1999 and to Benelux in 2000. After the death of Erich Faltermeier in 2012, the Trio de Bruxelles could no longer engage in any musical performances until Miklos Mikael Spanyi recompleted the trio.

Müller-Doppler has worked as an editor and published his transcriptions from Johann Sebastian Bach, Tschaikowsky und Wolfgang Amadeus Mozart for flute and piano in publishing Universal Edition. Müller-Doppler transmuted, among Mozart's five Divertimento KV 439b, in the original cast for two clarinets (basset horns) and bassoon, for flute and piano.

In der Tradition von Jean-Pierre Rampal he transmuted lost Musical Works such Romantic Violin compositions for flute and piano.

== Discography ==
- Doppler plays Doppler, Fronda/Fern (2007)
