= Mathieu Dufour =

French flutist (born 1973)

- Born: 28 December 1973 (age 52); Paris, France
- Genre: Classical
- Instrument: Flute
- Formerly of: Chicago Symphony; Los Angeles Philharmonic; Berlin Philharmonic

Mathieu Dufour (born 28 December 1973 in Paris) is a French classical flutist. He is a former principal flutist of the Berlin Philharmonic.

== Early life ==
Dufour began playing the flute at the age of 8. He studied under Madeleine Chassang and Maxence Larrieu at the Lyon Conservatory.

== Career ==
Dufour was appointed principal flute of the Orchestre National du Capitole de Toulouse in 1993, and then held the same position with the Paris Opera in 1996. He plays on a Yamaha YFL-997 flute.

Dufour was appointed principal flute of the Chicago Symphony Orchestra in 1999 by Daniel Barenboim. He briefly left in September 2009 to play principal flute with the Los Angeles Philharmonic, though later stated he had joined them on a one-year trial basis and was able to hold positions with both orchestras. He returned to Chicago in January 2010. He joined the Berlin Philharmonic as principal flute in August 2015, replacing the retiring Andreas Blau and sharing the role with Emmanuel Pahud. He left the orchestra in December 2021 at his own request for personal reasons, and was succeeded in May 2022 by Sébastian Jacot.
