= Robert Langevin =

Canadian flautist

Robert Langevin is a Canadian flutist. He has been principal flutist of the New York Philharmonic since 2000 and is a former principal flutist of the Pittsburgh Symphony Orchestra. He was associate principal flautist with the Montreal Symphony Orchestra for 13 years and can be heard on more than 30 recordings with that orchestra. He is a former faculty member of Duquesne University and the Université de Montréal. He currently serves on the faculties of the Juilliard School and the Manhattan School of Music.

Langevin was born in Sherbrooke, Quebec, and at the age of 12 began studying the flute privately in his native city. At the age of 15, he began playing the flute in the Sherbrooke Symphony Orchestra. He earned premier prix in flute performance and chamber music from the Conservatoire de musique du Québec à Montréal in 1976 where he was a pupil of Jean-Paul Major. While a student there, he began working as a session artist in Toronto recording studios.

In 1976, Langevin won the Prix d'Europe. The award provided him the opportunity to pursue graduate studies at the Hochschule für Musik Freiburg with Aurèle Nicolet. After graduating from that school in 1979, he pursued further studies with Maxence Larrieu in Geneva. In 1980, he was awarded second prize at the Budapest International Competition.

== Sources ==
- Biography of Robert Langevin at nyphil.org
