= Broekmans & Van Poppel =

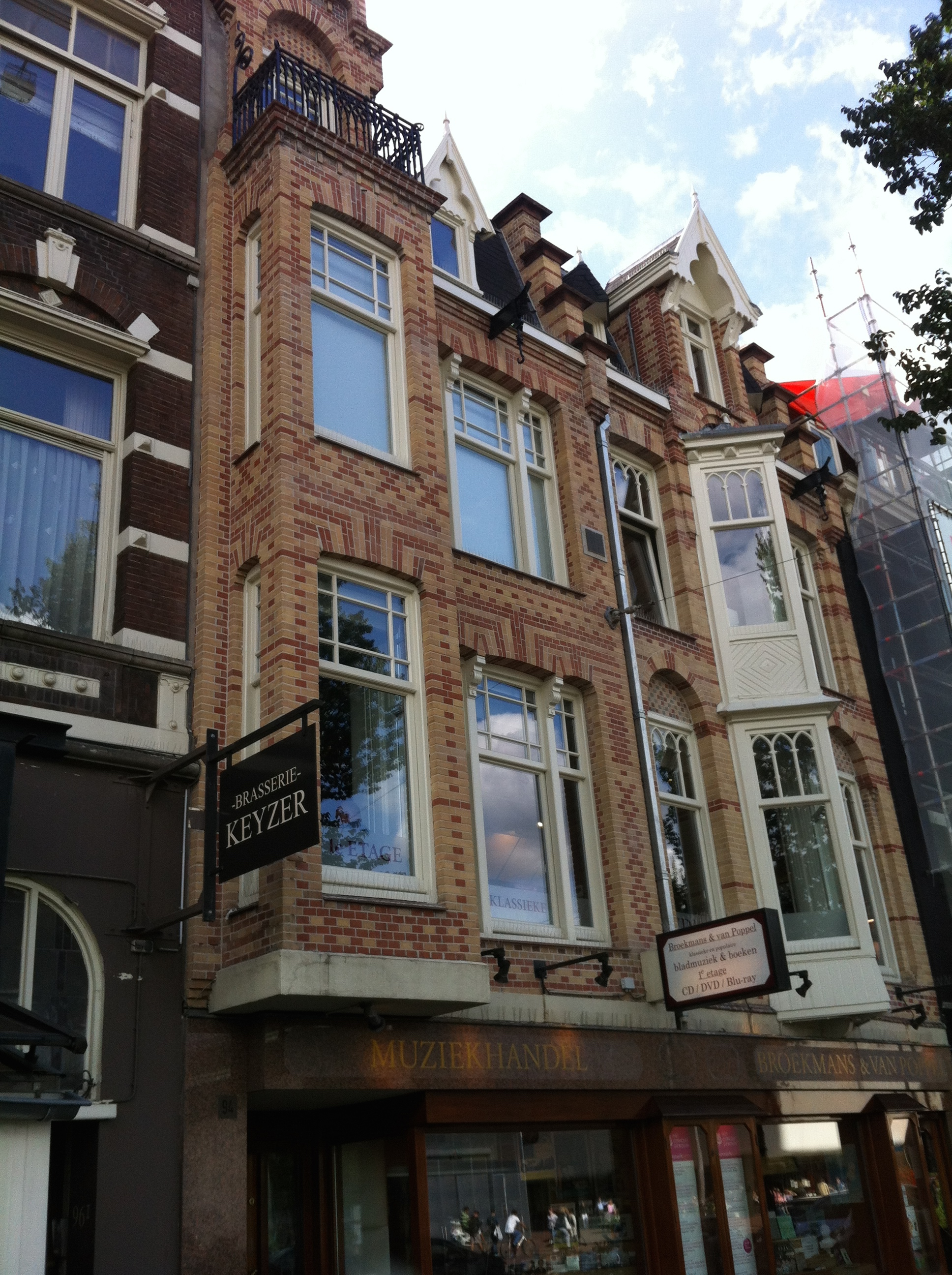
Broekmans & Van Poppel in the Van Baerlestraat in Amsterdam

Broekmans & van Poppel is a private company founded in 1914 by Mr. Broekmans and Van Poppel. The company focuses on music publishing and trade in sheet music.

Broekmans & Van Poppel is mainly known for its shops in Badhoevedorp (formerly in Amsterdam, on the Van Baerlestraat, next to the Concertgebouw) and in Utrecht. In the music business, the specialization lies in a large collection of sheet music. As a publisher of sheet music, Broekmans & Van Poppel distinguishes itself through the many publications of music for educational purposes.

== History ==
Broekmans and van Poppel were founded in the early 20th century by Broekmans and Van Poppel. On 18 November 1915 a well-known Dutch violinist Karel van der Meer opened a music store in part of the present building. At the time of the opening, the business was in the name of Fa. K van der Meer & van Roosmalen. Soon after that the name changed to Broekmans and van Poppel. The business was later managed by a man named Petrus Ganzinotti, but the store was still known under the previous name. The company is now in the hands of the fourth generation of the Ganzinotti family. In December 2016 the store was closed in the Van Baerlestraat and in January 2017 a building was renovated in Badhoevedorp so that it could serve as a store location.

The publisher now has an online branch after modernization.
