= Funk Trek =

- Origin: Omaha, Nebraska, United States
- Genres: Jazz funk, jazz fusion, soul jazz
- Years active: 2008–present
- Labels: Funk Trek Records
- Members: Tom Murnan, Daniel Pflug, Jared Dietz, Jake Reisdorff, Blake DeForest, Don Halverson
- Past members: Jay Egger, Alain Hernandez, Rob Barr, Andrew Wahl, Mike Lovejoy, Cameron Blazek, Kevin Pflug
- Website: www.funktrek.com

Funk Trek is a funk/jazz fusion band formed in 2008 in Omaha, Nebraska by cousins Tom Murnan and Daniel Pflug, with guitarist and friend Andrew Wahl. Funk Trek has released four studio albums, the most recent being Plasticity, released in 2019.

== Discography ==
- Voyager (2010)
- Purify (2013)
- Quencher (2015)
- Plasticity (2019)
