= Ma Anand Yashu =

Ma Anand Yashu (9 October 1956 – 3 December 2007) was an Indian-Spanish flautist. She performed in a duo with Toti Soler in the early 1980s and was based in Barcelona for many years. In 2001, her album Shanti Shanti topped the New Age Chart in the United States. She returned to Goa in 2003, where she died of cancer in 2007.
