= Fostina Dixon =

American jazz musician

Fostina Dixon (August 16, 1956) is an American jazz saxophonist, clarinetist, flautist, and vocalist.

== Early life and studies ==
Dixon was born in Wilmington, Delaware and began her career in the early 1970s, playing with Buddy Collette, Frank Foster, and Andy McGhee. She studied at Boston University, Berklee College of Music, and California Institute of the Arts, where she received a Fine Arts degree. She also studied at Wilmington University, where she received a master's degree in education.

== Career ==
In the early 1980s Dixon led her own group, "Collage", and worked with Cab Calloway, Jimmy Cleveland, Gil Evans, Slide Hampton, Major Holley, Melba Liston, and Gerald Wilson. She was a saxophonist in Marvin Gaye's touring band in the last few years of his life. Following this she played with Roy Ayers, Andrew Cyrille, and Charlie Persip, and worked with a new ensemble under her own direction, "Winds of Change".

From 1986 to 1988 she accompanied James "Blood" Ulmer on tour, then appeared on Calvin Weston's 1989 album Dance Romance. In the 1990s she worked with Abbey Lincoln and Loud Minority.

She founded the Wilmington Youth Jazz Band in 2004 in her native city.

== Critical reactions ==
A review of Here We Go Again in All About Jazz described it as "a thoroughly engaging journey that seamlessly transports the listener with spiritual-like soundscapes."

AllMusic writes of Dixon that her "commitment is total, and she is also eager to extend her audience by finding a style in both playing and composing that appeals beyond the merely intellectual."

== Discography ==
- Here We Go Again Fossiebear Inc. (2016) The album has seven tracks for a total duration of 18:30.
