= Carlos Bruneel =

Belgian flautist

Carlos Bruneel is a Belgian flautist. He has played throughout Europe, America and Japan.

He studied at the Conservatory of Antwerp with Jan Van Reeth. In 1982 he carried off the Belgium Tenuto Contest. He continued studying in London with Jonathan Snowdon and took master classes from Aurèle Nicolet and William Bennett.

He has been flute soloist with La Monnaie Symphonic Orchestra since 1981 and others like the BRTN Ancient Philharmonic Orchestra, and several chamber orchestras including Prima La Musica and Collegium Instrumentale Brugense.

Bruneel is member of the Prometheus Ensemble and of the La Monnaie Wind Quintet. He plays recitals with pianists as Jan Michiels, Levente Kende or Daniël Blumenthal.

Carlos Bruneel has been professor flute at the Brussels Royal Conservatory since 1994. He gives master classes throughout Europe and Japan and often is a jury member for international competitions.
