= Adolf Scherbaum (composer) =

Austrian composer, flautist, painter and graphic artist

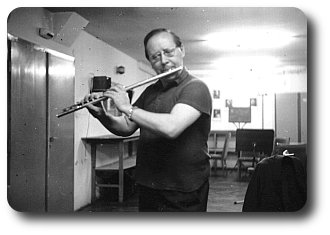
- Adolf Scherbaum, Composer and Flautist
- Born: 15 August 1931; Vienna, Austria
- Died: 10 March 2003 (aged 71); Linz, Austria
- Occupation: Composer

Adolf Scherbaum (15 August 1931 – 10 March 2003) was an Austrian composer, flautist, painter and graphic artist. His entire opus, around 2000 compositions, is stored in the Music Department of the Austrian National Library in Vienna. The composer's sister, Inge Adamiker-Scherbaum, has made his entire opus accessible to the public through a website.

Scherbaum was born in Vienna. He was one of the most prolific composers of the twentieth century, and wrote almost 2000 pieces. He died in Linz.
