= Stefán Ragnar Höskuldsson =

Icelandic flutist (born 1975)

- Born: June 20, 1975 (age 51); Neskaupstaður, Iceland
- Genre: Classical
- Occupations: Musician, professor
- Instrument: Flute
- Member of: Berlin Philharmonic Orchestra
- Formerly of: Metropolitan Opera; Chicago Symphony Orchestra

Stefán Ragnar Höskuldsson is an Icelandic classical flutist. He is one of the principal flutists of the Berlin Philharmonic Orchestra.

== Career ==
Stefán began learning the recorder at the age of 6 before switching to the flute. He studied at the Reykjavík College of Music with Bernhard Wilkinson from 1988 to 1995, and later at the Royal Northern College of Music with Peter Lloyd.

He was principal flute of the Metropolitan Opera from 2008 to 2016, and of the Chicago Symphony Orchestra from 2015 to 2025.

In December 2025, he replaced Sébastian Jacot as principal flute of the Berlin Philharmonic Orchestra. He passed the probationary period in July 2026 and became an official member of the orchestra.

While living in Chicago, he also taught at the DePaul University School of Music and the Pacific Music Festival. He performs on Emanuel flutes and worked with Emanuel Arista in developing a modern headjoint.
