= John C. Krell =

John C. Krell (2 April 1914 – 10 January 1999) was an American flutist, piccoloist, author and teacher.

== Early life ==
John Christian Krell was one of six surviving children of Adolph Jacob Krell and Flossie V. Howell Krell. Adolph was a German immigrant and became a citizen at age 21. Their children were John Christian, Eleanor, Ruth, Walter, Frederick, and Donald. Music was an integral part of their working-class upbringing in Saganaw Michigan. Adolph Krell played flute with the Saginaw Civic Symphony, the Germania Symphony, and the Orpheus Trio. He taught his son the flute beginning at age ten and John picked up the piccolo on his own at the same time.

A member of the Saginaw High Band, he was selected in 1928 to represent the school as a flutist in the National High School Orchestra, held in the Music Supervisors National Conference in Chicago, March 22–29. "He studied at Interlochen National Music Camp during the summer of 1930 and graduated from Saginaw High School in 1933."

== College and music conservatory ==
John Krell received a bachelor of music degree from the University of Michigan in 1937. While at the University of Michigan he was elected to Phi Kappa Phi and was vice-president of his class. He then went on to study flute with William Kincaid at the Curtis Institute of Music from 1938 to 1941. While a student there he substituted with the Philadelphia Orchestra.

== Leopold Stokowski's All-American Youth Orchestra ==
During the summer of 1941 John Krell toured fifty-four US cities, Canada and Mexico as principal flutist for Leopold Stokowski's All-American Youth Orchestra. The orchestra recorded many albums for Columbia Masterworks by the end of the season.

== Mid-life and career ==
In the fall of 1941 Krell entered the Army and played flute and piccolo in the Fort Riley, Kansas band. While in the army, The Curtis Institute graduated him in 1942. After his discharge from the Army in 1946, John Krell played flute and piccolo with the National Symphony Orchestra from 1947 - 1951. During his tenure with the National Symphony, Krell met and married Marjorie Ann McCormick, who spent World War II as a member of the Office of Strategic Services and was decorated for her work by both the United States and Italy. They were married January 28, 1951, by US Supreme Court Justice Felix Frankfurter.

=== Philadelphia Orchestra piccoloist ===
In 1952 Krell began playing piccolo in Philadelphia Orchestra under the baton of conductor Eugene Ormandy, in the flute section of his teacher William Kincaid, a position he held for twenty-nine years. His piccolo can be heard on the many recordings produced by the orchestra from 1952 through 1981.

"Hearing John play in the Philadelphia Orchestra was perhaps the greatest inspiration of all. To this day, I can always recognize his sound - big and round, soaring over the entire orchestra. He believed that the piccolo is the 'coloratura soprano' of the orchestra, and his playing was a true reflection of that belief." - Laurie Sokoloff, Solo Piccolo, Baltimore Symphony Orchestra, Peabody Conservatory flute instructor and student of John Krell

=== Orchestral soloist ===
In 1954 John Krell gave the Vivaldi Concerto in A minor its premiere American performance as a piccolo solo at the Peninsula Music Festival under the baton of Thor Johnson which he repeated in 1972. He recorded a concerto for flute, clarinet and bassoon with the Peninsula Festival Orchestra in 1958 for CRI. Another performance of the Vivaldi Concerto was given at the Ann Arbor May Festival with the Philadelphia Orchestra accompanying on May 5, 1957. A later winter performance of the Vivaldi Concerto with the Philadelphia Orchestra at the Academy of Music, Philadelphia was considered a "rare phenomenon" by the Philadelphia Inquirer critic Edwin H. Schloss, "Krell gave it an expert performance and the audience warmly endorsed the experiment".

=== Awards and honors ===
John Krell is a recipient of the C. Hartmann Kuhn Award, given annually to “the member of the Philadelphia Orchestra who has shown musical ability and enterprise of such character as to enhance the musical standards and the reputation of the ensemble.” He received the University of Michigan's Citation of Merit in 1981. He is also a 1995 recipient of the National Flute Association's Lifetime Achievement Award.

=== Author ===
The notes from his private studies with William Kincaid and his class experience with woodwind instructor Marcel Tabuteau at the Curtis Institute were later made into a book entitled Kincaidiana, A flute player's notebook. John Krell conveys the essential elements of the teaching of William Kincaid, the distinguished principal flutist of the Philadelphia Orchestra from 1921 to 1960.

"John Krell possessed qualities given to very few of his chosen profession... each time the orchestration called upon the piccolo those of us privileged to work with him were immediately reminded that this was someone 'special'. John was the model instrumentalist. He displayed sensitivity in his playing that revealed an understanding of the special schooling entrusted to us and that his integrity defended against whatever the odds. Kincaidiana is a testimony to this understanding and exists as both a unique tribute to his teachers (William Kincaid and Marcel Tabuteau) as well as a gift to succeeding generations as an invaluable method - John de Lancie (oboist), Former Solo Oboe, Philadelphia Orchestra, Former Director, Curtis Institute of Music"

Krell's publications include his 20th Century Orchestra Studies book published by G. Schirmer, edition #6077077 and his pamphlet, The Piccolo: An Artist's Approach for Armstrong Flutes.

=== Teacher ===
John Krell's students occupy positions in symphony orchestras, have solo careers and teach at Music Conservatories and universities. During his career with the Philadelphia Orchestra John Krell taught at the following Philadelphia music schools and conservatories.

1. The Curtis Institute of Music
2. The Settlement School of Music
3. New School of Music, Philadelphia
4. The Philadelphia Music Academy
5. Temple University

== Death ==
Krell died of a heart attack on January 10, 1999. In accord with his wishes, his remains were donated to medical science.
