= Vladimir Tsybin =

Russian composer

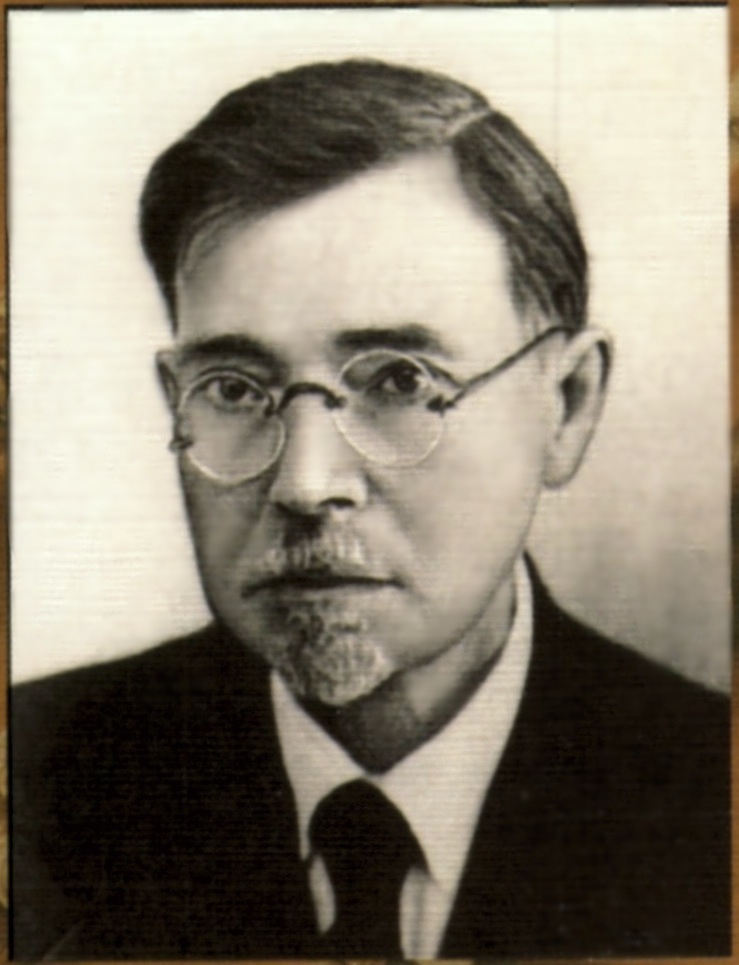
- Born: July 11, 1877; Ivanovo-Voznesensk, Russia
- Died: May 29, 1949 (aged 71); Moscow, Russia
- Occupation(s): Flautist, composer, conductor

Vladimir Tsybin (Russian: Владимир Николаевич Цыбин; July 11, 1877 in Ivanovo-Voznesensk – May 29, 1949 in Moscow) was a flautist, composer and conductor.

Born in a family of musicians - his father was a violinist and conductor of a small town orchestra, his mother had a good voice and played guitar. After moving to Moscow, boy's father soon died, and the 9 year old Vladimir was sent to a military orchestra, where he learned to play the flute and piccolo. At age 12 he entered the Moscow Conservatory where he studied flute with Wilhelm Kretschmann (1848–1922). He played in different private orchestras and in 1896 entered Bolshoi Theater as a piccolo player. He held this position until 1907, when, after death of Ernesto Köhler, he became the soloist of the Mariinsky Theater in Sankt-Petersburg. From 1910 to 1914 he studied composition and conducting in Saint Petersburg Conservatory with Alexander Glazunov, Anatoly Lyadov and Nicolai Tcherepnin. In 1914 he was appointed the professor of flute in St.Petersburg Conservatory. In 1920 he returned to Moscow, where he founded a musical school with his wife in the suburb of the city (Pushkino). Soon after he re-entered Bolschoi Theater as a flute solo, and in 1923 was appointed the flute professor of the Moscow Conservatory, where he taught until the end of his life.

Vladimir Tsybin is considered to be the founder of the Russian flute school. His works for flute were composed between 1921 and 1949. A national flute competition carrying his name is held in Moscow each three years.

== Selected works ==
- Ballet suite
- Symphony in E–dur
- 3 Concertos (Concert allegros) for flute and piano (orchestra)
- Concertos for trumpet, clarinet, oboe, horn, harp
- Andante and Tarantella for flute and piano
- 10 concert studies for flute and piano
- Romances for soprano and piano
