= William Bennett (flautist) =

British flautist and teacher (1936–2022)

William Bennett OBE
- Born: William Ingham Brooke Bennett; 7 February 1936; London, Middlesex, England
- Died: 11 May 2022 (aged 86); London, Middlesex, Greater London, England
- Education: Guildhall School of Music and Drama
- Occupations: Classical flautist; teacher
- Organizations: London Symphony Orchestra; English Chamber Orchestra; Academy of St Martin-in-the-Fields; Melos Ensemble; Hochschule für Musik Freiburg; Royal Academy of Music

William Ingham Brooke Bennett OBE (7 February 1936 – 11 May 2022) was a British flautist and teacher. He played in many English orchestras and chamber music ensembles, and as a soloist. He made more than 100 recordings, including chamber music with partners including George Malcolm, Osian Ellis, and Yehudi Menuhin. He premiered flute concertos written for him, by William Mathias, Diana Burrell and Raimundo Pineda. Bennett taught at the Hochschule für Musik Freiburg in Germany and the Royal Academy of Music, and held master classes worldwide.

== Early life and studies ==
William Ingham Brooke Bennett was born in London to parents who were both architects. He boarded at Beltane School until he was 16, starting his school life as a seven-year-old during the Second World War. He started playing the recorder at the age of 8 and the flute at 12. He studied the flute in London with Geoffrey Gilbert from the age of 15 and went to the Guildhall School of Music and Drama a year later. Instead of doing two years of compulsory national military service after the war, he chose instead to serve three years in the Scots Guards band, which allowed him to continue his studies at the Guildhall School of Music. He went to Paris on a French government scholarship at 21, where he had lessons with Fernand Caratgé and Jean-Pierre Rampal. In the 1960s, he studied with Marcel Moyse.

== Career and recordings ==
At the age of 22, Bennett started working in his first principal flute position in the BBC Northern Orchestra (now the BBC Philharmonic). He played with major British orchestras, including Sadlers Wells Opera, the London Symphony Orchestra, the English Chamber Orchestra and the Academy of St Martin-in-the-Fields. He played and recorded with chamber music ensembles, including the Melos Ensemble, Nash Ensemble, Vesuvius Ensemble and Prometheus Ensemble.

As a soloist he had partnerships with harpsichordist George Malcolm, with whom he recorded the complete Bach flute sonatas and Mozart concertos, and with pianist Clifford Benson and harpist Osian Ellis, with whom he recorded extensively. In his solo recordings he partnered with Yehudi Menuhin, the Grumiaux Trio, I Musici, the Academy of St. Martin-in-the-Fields, and the English Chamber Orchestra, and also recorded with artists such as Jimi Hendrix and Wynton Marsalis. He rerecorded the complete Handel flute sonatas, with Harold Lester, and contemporary works such as Berio's Sequenza, Boulez's Sonatine, Messiaen's Merle Noir, and Richard Rodney Bennett's Winter Music which was composed for him.

In addition to recording the standard flute repertoire, he made first recordings of 19th century works by Ferdinand Ries, Bernhard Romberg, and Paul Taffanel. He premiered concertos by William Mathias, Diana Burrell and Venezuelan composer Raimundo Pineda, written for him. Bennett had his own record label, "Beep Records". In the 1980s, he was professor of flute at the Hochschule für Musik Freiburg in Germany, and he taught at the Royal Academy of Music in London and at masterclasses all over the world. Bennett ran his own school, the International Flute Summer School, and was president of the British Flute Society.

== Personal life ==
Bennett was usually known by his initials, WIBB. He had two daughters from his first marriage (1961) to cellist Rhuna Martin. His elder daughter, Vanora Bennett, is a writer; his younger daughter is an Arabist who works as a translator for international organizations. In 1981, he married Michie, a fellow flautist who is producer and director of Beep Records, and has run the International Flute Summer School for 35 years. Bennett had skills in art.

Bennett died on 11 May 2022 at age 86.

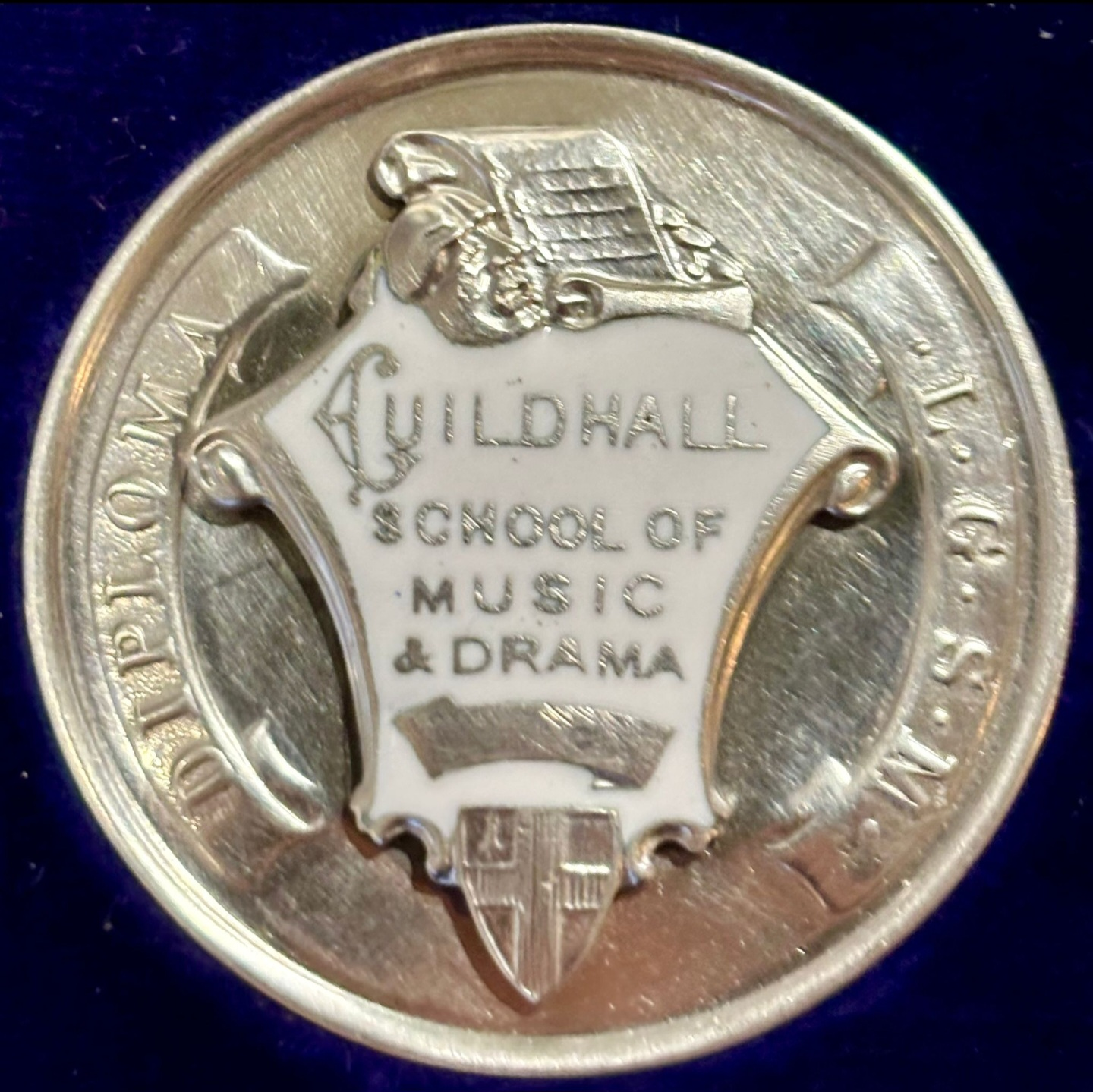
LGSM Silver Medal Side A

== Awards and recognition ==
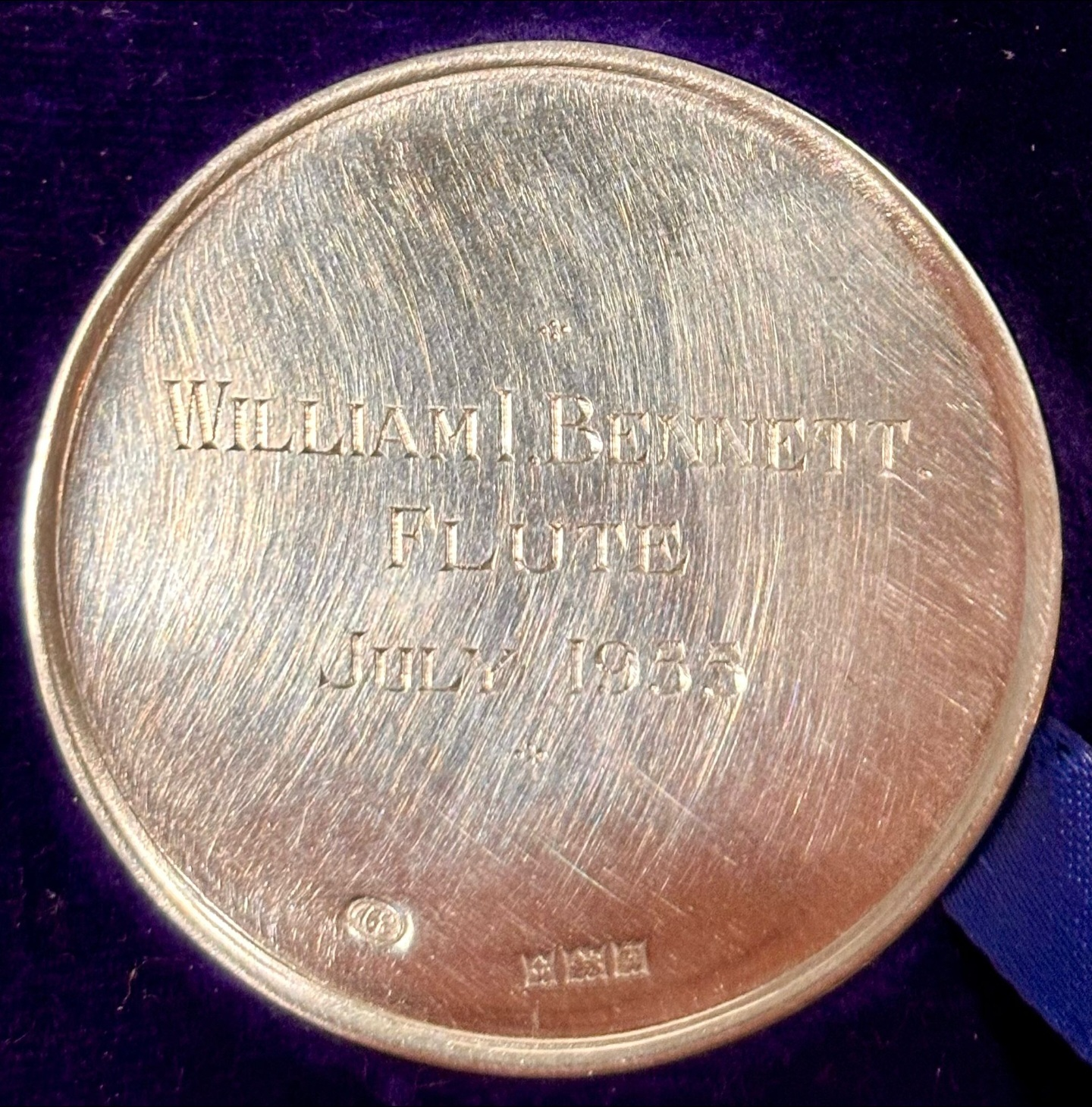
LGSM Silver Medal Side B

For his distinguished services to music, Bennett was awarded the Order of the British Empire (OBE) in 1995. He was appointed Flautist Laureate by the British Flute Society in 2003. In 2004, he gained the title of Flute of Gold from the Italian Falaut Flute society. He also received two Lifetime Achievement Awards, one from the National Flute Association in 2002 and another from the Chicago Flute Club in 2009. In 2018, he was awarded the Walter Willson Cobbett Medal by the Worshipful Company of Musicians "in recognition of services to chamber music".

== William Bennett scale ==
In addition to making a balalaika and a guitar whilst still at school, Bennett's dissatisfaction with the intonation of his flute led him to start altering the position of the tone holes of his flute when he was 18 years old. He invented the tuning patch, and then built his own flute at age 20. He worked to improve the scale further, in collaboration with other British flautists and makers, which helped to improve the intonation of the modern flute. Many makers use the William Bennett scales, including Altus Flute. Jack Moore, Emerson DeFord, Arista Flutes, Emanuel Flutes, Tom Green.

== Recordings ==
Bennett made more than 100 recordings, including:

- My Favorite Encores (Southern Music)
- Paul Taffanel: Mignon Fantasie (Southern Music)
- J. S. Bach: Six Sonatas for Flute and Keyboard (Vol. 1 and 2, Chester)
- Sir Arthur Sullivan: Twilight for 2 Flutes and Piano (Emerson Edition)
- Paul A. Genin: Air Napolitain (Alry Publications)
- Faure: Fantaisie for 2 Flutes and Piano (Alry Publications)
- J. S. Bach: Sinfonia Cantata No. 209 (Pan Educational Music)
- Chopin: Nocturne in D-flat, for 2 flutes and piano (Alry Publications)
- C. Benson: Song for Wibb (Pan Educational Music)
- W. A. Mozart: Adagio and Rondo (Pan Educational Music)
- Paul Taffanel: Jean de Nivelle (Broekmans & Van Poppel B.V)
- Paul Taffanel: Francesca di Rimini (Broekmans & Van Poppel B.V)
