= Mark Holland (musician) =

- Origin: Missouri, U.S.
- Genres: classical, jazz, chamber music
- Instruments: Flute, Native American flute

Mark Holland is an American musician from Missouri. He has a classical and jazz training and labels his music global chamber music. Holland primarily plays the Native American flute.

== Background ==
Holland first heard the Native American flute at a concert Webster University in 1994. His career began in the mid-1990s, and he has recorded 10 CDs. He tours widely and has performed with R. Carlos Nakai, Mary Youngblood, and Bill Miller. Holland started his group, Autumn's Child, in 1995.
