= Jacques Zoon =

Dutch flutist (born 1961)

- Born: 1961 (age 64–65); Heiloo, Netherlands
- Genres: Classical
- Instrument: Flute

Jacques Zoon (pronounced [ʒak zoːn]; born 1961 in Heiloo, North Holland) is a Dutch flutist.

== Education ==
Following a gymnasium education in Alkmaar, Zoon studied flute at the Sweelinck Conservatorium in Amsterdam with Koos Verheul and Harrie Starreveld, graduating with honors. He continued his studies at the Banff Center for the Arts in Canada, where he took master classes with Geoffrey Gilbert and András Adorján.

== Orchestras ==
As a teenager and during his studies, Zoon played in the Dutch National Youth Orchestra and the European Union Youth Orchestra, among others under the direction of Claudio Abbado and Leonard Bernstein. From 1988 to 1994, Zoon was principal flutist of the Royal Concertgebouw Orchestra, his arrival coinciding with that of conductor Riccardo Chailly. With this orchestra he performed flute concertos by Mozart, André Jolivet, Frank Martin, and Sofia Gubaidulina. Until 1997, he also was principal flutist of and frequent soloist with the Chamber Orchestra of Europe, conducted by Claudio Abbado, Bernard Haitink, and Nicolaus Harnoncourt. He played as principal flute with the Berlin Philharmonic Orchestra under the baton of Claudio Abbado. From 1997 to 2001, he was principal flutist of the Boston Symphony Orchestra under Seiji Ozawa. In 1998, the Boston Globe elected him as "musician of the year". Zoon is a regular principal flutist of the Lucerne Festival Orchestra. He has also been the principal flutist of the Orchestra Mozart since 2004 conducted by Claudio Abbado. He has played as a soloist with orchestras and at festivals in Europe, Japan and the United States. He has made many recordings for multiple labels such as Deutsche Grammophon, Philips, Decca etc.

== Teaching ==
Zoon has been a professor of flute at the Rotterdam Conservatory (1988–1992), Indiana University (1994–1997), and the New England Conservatory and Boston University (1997–2001). Since 2002, he has taught at the Conservatoire Supérieur de Musique de Genève and since 2008 at Madrid's Reina Sofía School of Music and International Chamber Music Institute of Madrid.

== Instrument maker ==
Zoon plays an old wooden French flute using headjoints he manufactures himself. He designed and created a traverso with a Boehm system, with which he recorded Bach's Partita in A minor for solo flute. He published a better key design for the C-sharp. With the Alkmaar-based flute builder Alfred Verhoef he constructed a "push flute", the flautus tremendus, with which he performed the Dutch premiere of Gubaidulina's flute concerto. With the William S. Haynes Flute Company of Boston he developed a new wooden flute (named "the Zoon model").

== Awards ==
- 2nd prize at the Willem Pijper Concours in 1981
- The jury prize at the Jean-Pierre Rampal flute competition in 1987 in Paris
- Boston Globe elected him as "musician of the year" in 1998
- Edison Award for the recording of modern classical music for flute and piano with his longtime (since 1978) accompanist Bernd Brackman in 1999 .
