= Trevor Wye =

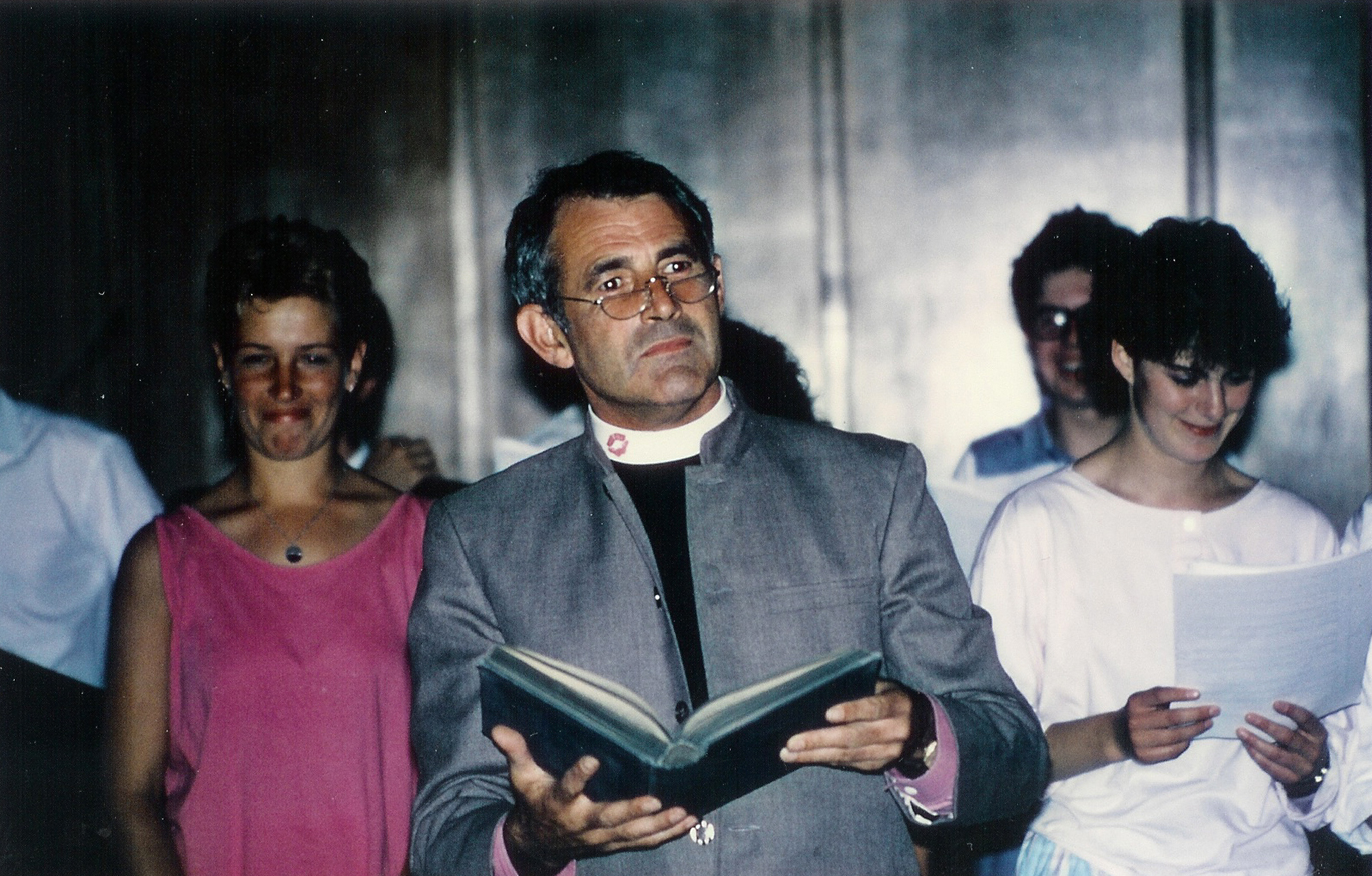
- Trevor Wye (middle) in 1986

Background information
- Born: 6 June 1935 (age 91)
- Origin: United Kingdom
- Genres: Classical
- Occupation: Flautist
- Years active: 1949-present
- Website: Trevor Wye's Homepage

Trevor Wye (born 6 June 1935) is a professional English flautist, flute instructor, and author of books about flute playing. He was a founder of the British Flute Society and International Summer School for flute, serving as director of the latter from 1969 to 1988.

Wye began playing the flute at age 15 and studied privately with Marcel Moyse, whom he credits as a major influence on his career. He went on to be a pupil of Geoffrey Gilbert and further acknowledges the influences of Alfred Deller and William Bennett.

He was a freelance orchestral and chamber player in London for many years and has released several solo recordings. He served as a professor at the Guildhall School of Music, London, for fourteen years, and at the Royal Northern College of Music, Manchester, for twenty-two years. The latter awarded him an honorary degree in 1990.

Wye teaches a winter residential course for postgraduate students and travels the world giving masterclasses and concerts, serving as an adjudicator for international competitions, and giving recitals.

Wye's wife Dot died in October 2022.

Wye has published over 170 items including books, CDs, DVDs. They include the six-volume Practice Books for the Flute and A Beginner’s Book for the Flute series.

He has a large collection of antique flutes, both the western concert variety and others from around the world. He demonstrates about 60 of them in his Carnival Show.
