= Michel Bellavance =

Swiss flautist of Canadian origin

Michel Bellavance is a Swiss flautist of Canadian origin.

== Career ==
Miyazawa Artist Bellavance has performed concertos by Ibert, Reinecke, Nielsen, Kabalevsky, Bernstein, Liebermann, Mozart, Bach and Vivaldi with orchestras both in Europe and Latin America, including the Geneva Chamber Orchestra, the Lisbon Gulbenkian Foundation Orchestra, the Bahia Symphony Orchestra, the Mendoza Philharmonic Orchestra, the Maracaibo Symphony Orchestra and the National Symphony Orchestra of Peru.

He has appeared at festivals in Switzerland, the United States, Brazil, Chile, Peru, Venezuela, Colombia, Ecuador and Costa Rica, on radio broadcasts for the Radio Suisse Romande, the CBC, and National Public Radio (USA), and has given recitals in cities such as Geneva, Zürich, Basel, Paris, London, Prague, Barcelona, Madrid, Montréal, Ottawa, Washington DC, Sydney, Auckland, Tokyo, Hong Kong, Beijing, Shanghai, São Paulo, Brasília, Buenos Aires, Santiago de Chile, Bogotá and Lima.

His discs for Meridian Records, Atma Classique, Brioso Recordings and SNE have received international critical praise and attest to his keen interest for both new and less familiar repertoire.

In addition to his activities as a performer, Michel Bellavance is Professor of flute at the Geneva Conservatoire (HEM) (Switzerland), and regularly gives masterclasses in Europe, the Far East and Latin America, including the Royal College of Music, the Royal Academy of Music, the Guildhall School of Music and Drama, Sydney Conservatorium, University of Auckland, the Hong Kong Academy for Performing Arts, the Beijing and Shanghai Conservatories, and the San Jose and Lima International Flute Festivals.
