= Geoffrey Gilbert =

English flutist (1914–1989)

- Born: Geoffrey Winzer Gilbert; 28 May 1914; Liverpool, England
- Died: 18 May 1989 (aged 74) DeLand, Florida, U.S.
- Genres: Classical
- Occupations: Musician, professor
- Instrument: Flute
- Formerly of: London Philharmonic Orchestra

Geoffrey Winzer Gilbert (28 May 1914 – 1989) was an English flautist, who was a leading influence on British flute-playing, introducing a more flexible style, based on French techniques, with metal instruments replacing the traditional wood. He was a prominent member of five British symphony orchestras between 1930 and 1961, and in 1948 he founded a chamber ensemble of leading wind players.

After the Second World War Gilbert combined his playing career with teaching, holding appointments at music colleges in London, Manchester, and finally in Florida.

== Life and career ==
=== Early years ===
Gilbert was born in Liverpool, England, the son of Ernest Gilbert, an oboist, and his wife Jessie, née Thomas, a teacher. At the age of fourteen he won scholarships to Liverpool College of Music and the Royal Manchester College of Music (RMCM), and joined the Hallé and the Liverpool Philharmonic orchestras two years later. In 1933 Gilbert joined Sir Thomas Beecham's London Philharmonic Orchestra; he was its principal flautist at the age of nineteen.

At the time, British players still used the traditional wooden flute, which was blown strongly and with no vibrato. Gilbert recognised that French players such as Marcel Moyse, who played on metal flutes, could produce a far wider range of tone-colour. In 1937 he took lessons from the French flautist René le Roy (and also from the violinist Carl Flesch). With le Roy's encouragement he bought a Louis Lot silver flute, altered his embouchure and articulation, and mastered the use of vibrato to play in what the Grove Dictionary of Music and Musicians calls "the flexible and expressive French style". According to The Times, "his subsequent influence on other British flautists was enormous, and the wooden flute was quickly superseded".

Gilbert remained with the LPO until the outbreak of the Second World War in 1939, when he volunteered to join the Coldstream Guards. He remained nominally the orchestra's principal flautist until 1942, and managed to play in some concerts. He rejoined the London Philharmonic after the war (though Beecham was no longer its conductor), and became a teacher at the Guildhall School of Music and Trinity College of Music, London. His students included William Bennett, James Galway, Michael Graubart, Susan Milan, Stephen Preston and Trevor Wye.

=== Later career ===
In 1948 Gilbert founded the Wigmore Ensemble which brought together leading wind players of that generation including Jack Brymer, Terence MacDonagh and Gwydion Brooke. Dennis Brain played regularly with the ensemble, until his death in 1957. Gilbert's range embraced jazz and dance music: concurrently with his orchestra work he was Geraldo's flautist. In the concert hall Gilbert gave the British premieres of concertos by Ibert, Nielsen and Jolivet. In 1948 Gilbert joined the BBC Symphony Orchestra under Sir Adrian Boult. Sir Malcolm Sargent succeeded Boult as chief conductor in 1950; a professional disagreement with Sargent led to Gilbert's resignation in 1952. He rejoined Beecham, now with the Royal Philharmonic Orchestra, in 1957. In 1960 Eugene Ormandy unsuccessfully sought to appoint Gilbert to the principal flute position in the Philadelphia Orchestra; Beecham died in 1961 and Gilbert concluded, "after the loss of Sir Thomas from the musical world I no longer felt that I wanted to be a regular member of a symphony orchestra except perhaps an odd performance as a guest artist"; he never again played regularly with any other orchestra though he was the guest principal with the London Symphony Orchestra on occasion.

From 1957 to 1969 Gilbert was director of wind studies at the RMCM, before moving to Stetson University in Florida in the US, where he remained for ten years, as director of instrumental studies and conductor in residence. He was in demand for masterclasses in the US and Europe. Gilbert described the keynote of his teaching as "compassion", but, an obituarist commented, "inevitably it was also his meticulous attitude. and his ability to concentrate furiously that made an indelible impression on his best pupils." His life and influence are documented by Angeleita Stevens Floyd in The Gilbert Legacy, published in 1990, and reissued in 2004.

Gilbert was the father of the television scriptwriter, director and producer John Selwyn Gilbert, who wrote:

My father was a great player and "a rare teacher" as William Bennett wrote in an obituary. Sir James Galway also pays tribute to him in his autobiography. He inspired more than one generation of British flute players and many of the leading players in British orchestras studied with him or with his pupils. A studio at the Guildhall School of Music is dedicated to his memory and Angeleita Floyd's book about him and his methods, published in 1990, is still available. He was a modest, gentle and dignified man whose only faults were his heavy smoking and his total inability to cook. My mother tolerated the first and compensated splendidly for the second. Her part in his achievement should never be underestimated.

Gilbert died in DeLand, Florida, at the age of 74. He left a widow, a son and a daughter. In its obituary The Times said, "Small, with rimless glasses and a little moustache. he sometimes seemed like an animated mouse in performance, but in the orchestral world he had a giant reputation." A memorial was created in the form of the Gilbert Memorial Endowment Fund administered by the Florida Flute Association (FFA). The fund gives financial grants to performers and teachers to help them with further study.

== Recordings ==
Among the recordings on which Gilbert plays are pre-war LPO sets under Beecham, including a series of Mozart symphonies, recorded across several years beginning in 1934, and, with Beecham and the Royal Philharmonic, symphonies by Haydn and Schubert, Rimsky-Korsakov's Scheherazade, Richard Strauss's Ein Heldenleben, works by Delius, and many French pieces, including Debussy's Prélude à l'après-midi d'un faune with its prominent opening flute solo. With Fritz Reiner and the RPO Gilbert recorded Brahms's Fourth Symphony and with Rafael Kubelík and the RPO, Bartók's Concerto for Orchestra.
