= Brulé (band) =

New Age / worldbeat musical group

- Origin: Lower Brule, South Dakota, United States
- Genres: Native American music, rock, pop, instrumental
- Years active: 1995–present
- Labels: Buffalo Moon Records; Sound of America Records
- Members: Paul LaRoche; Nicole LaRoche; Shane LaRoche; Vlasis Pergakis
- Past members: Moses Brings Plenty; Clay Bryan; Kurt Olsen
- Website: www.brulemusic.com www.facebook.com/brulerecords/

Brulé & AIRO is a contemporary Native American new-age/worldbeat music group based in South Dakota. They have sold over one million CDs worldwide, won a number of awards, and have made media appearances with the Live with Regis and Kathie Lee television show, CNN WorldBeat, QVC, and others. They maintain a schedule of well over 100 performances a year including full stage productions with traditional dancers, an annual holiday tour, performances at Milwaukee's Indian Summer Festival, Indian Art Markets in Denver, Arlington (Tx.), and Overland Park, Kansas, Harbor Fest in Virginia Beach, the world-renowned Ordway Theater in St. Paul, Foxwoods Casino, and many additional outdoor festivals and events. They have released 22 CDs over their 21-year existence.

== History ==
=== Early life ===
Paul LaRoche, the founding member of Brulé, grew up as part of a white middle-class family in the small community of Worthington in southwest Minnesota. He was adopted at birth from the Lower Brule Sioux Tribe reservation in South Dakota. LaRoche was aware of his adoption but his true heritage was kept a secret from him for unknown reasons.

After both of his adoptive parents died, Kathy, LaRoche's wife, discovered his adoption papers. After several years of searching, in 1993 when LaRoche discovered his biological Lakota family.

=== The SOAR years ===
In 1995 Paul signed a record deal with Sound of America Records. There he developed Brulé's first CDs. We the People, Lakota Piano, One Nation and collaboration with Robby Bee entitled One Holy Night were all produced in just four months. Upon returning home Paul and his family made the move to the Lower Brule Reservation where they still maintain a residence to this day. With only the bare necessities, Paul was about to set out on his new musical endeavor as a solo artist. But before he could walk out the door for his first live performance, his daughter Nicole offered to join and play the melodies on her flute, Brulé became a duo. Starting from nothing, Brulé worked the art show circuit slowly gaining exposure and a solid fan base. Nicole began to carve out her own sound and style and became the group's lead instrumentalist. Guitar and the traditional drum were soon added to the mix as the band started to form. In 1999 Paul and the band received their first of many awards, Paul was presented the 1999 "Outstanding Musical Achievement Award" by the First Americans in the Arts for One Nation.

=== Projects featuring Nicole ===
In 2001 Paul formed Buffalo Moon Productions with aim of featuring Nicole's flute playing on future CDs. Passion Spirit was released in 2001 featuring Nicole's unique style of flute playing. In 2002 Paul completed his next SOAR release entitled Star People. The title track from the CD quickly became a crowd favorite. Ten minutes in length, the fast-paced song closes out every Brulé performance. In the same year Brulé won their first Native American Music Awards (NAMA or NAMMYS). Star People was honored as the Best Instrumental CD of 2002 while Brulé was named the Native American Group of the Year. By the end of 2002 Paul's son Shane had completed college and quickly joined the family business on guitar. By 2003 the band was steadily maintaining a schedule of over 70 performances a year including full stage productions with lights, video, and Native American dancers. Nicole also released her follow-up CD to Passion Spirit entitled Night Tree. Night Tree also received a NAMA award for Best Instrumental CD in 2003. The band continued traveling and playing in 2004 but did not release a CD during the year, opting instead to prepare for multiple releases in 2005.

=== AIRO ===
As the group began to slowly become independent, Paul expanded Buffalo Moon Productions by introducing AIRO (American Indian Rock Opera) as an extension of the Brulé name. Performing for years under Paul's recording name, AIRO gave identity to the rest of the band members and the dance troupe. Paul was now able to record music with his whole band under AIRO. In 2005 Tatanka became AIRO's first release. Featuring an up-tempo rock sound Tatanka became an instant hit. Shortly after Tribal Rhythm was released. A more easy listening sound, Tribal Rhythm features Shane and the classical nylon string guitar, a new instrument for the group. In 2006 AIRO won its first NAMA for Group of the Year for Tatanka. Brulé also won that year for Best Compilation album for The Collection. As the summer wore on the group began to produce a long-awaited follow up to One Holy Night. When One Holy Night was released it was a ground breaking CD, the first to introduce Contemporary Native American Holiday music. Now able to use Brulé & AIRO together, Paul and the group released the new CD Silent Star Night in the fall of 2006. Taking the sound from One Holy Night a step further, Silent Star Night was the music featured in the band's 2006 holiday tour, the band's largest and most successful tour to date. Covering nine cities, the full stage production featured new video, dancers and lighting.

=== 2007 and beyond ===
2007 ushered in a history-making year for the group, Paul released his final CD for SOAR entitled Kinship, and Paul was able to realize a lifelong dream for Brulé & AIRO. On July 13 and 14, 2007 the group presented the "Brulé & AIRO Concerts for Reconciliation of the Cultures at Mount Rushmore" Performed at the Mount Rushmore Amphitheater at the base of the monument in the Black Hills of South Dakota. Performed in front of record crowds of 5,000 people the first night and over 6,000 the second night, the concerts featured the band's full stage production with special guests. Paul shared his story and his goals of peace, hope and reconciliation between the cultures. Both concerts were professionally filmed for a future broadcast on South Dakota public television and on other PBS affiliates across the country. On October 6, 2007, the 9th annual NAMA Awards were held. Brulé & AIRO were nominated for a record five awards and received two. For the second straight year they were honored with Group of the Year, this time for Silent Star Night, and Kinship received the Best New Age Recording Award. Silent Star Night was also nominated for an Aboriginal People's Choice Awards held in Canada. In November 2007 the group released the third installment of the Nicole CDs featuring Nicole LaRoche on flute. Entitled Deep Dreams the CD adds a new sound to the extensive Brulé & AIRO collection. On December 2, 2007, the first broadcast of "Brulé & AIRO Concerts for Reconciliation of the Cultures at Mount Rushmore" was presented as part of South Dakota's Public Television Pledge Drive. Two-thirds of the concert were aired while viewers were encouraged to make a pledge to SDPB. A DVD of the Mount Rushmore concerts as well as a live audio CD of the concert were offered as gifts to those who made pledges. The DVD and CD, along with a documentary of the making of the concert will be made available for sale to the public around the 1st of the year.

== Discography ==
=== Studio albums ===
Year	Title
1996	Brulé We the People
1997	Brulé Lakota Piano
1997	Red Nativity One Holy Night
1999	Brulé One Nation
2001	Nicole feat: Brulé Passion Spirit
2002	Brulé Star People
2003	Nicole feat: Brulé Night Tree
2005	AIRO feat: Brulé Tatanka
2005	AIRO feat: Brulé Tribal Rhythm
2006	Brulé & AIRO Silent Star Night
2006	Brulé Kinship
2007	Nicole feat: Brulé & AIRO Deep Dreams
2009	Brulé Lakota Piano II
2012	Nicole feat: Brulé Tapestry
2012	Brulé Hidden Heritage East
2013	Brulé Hidden Heritage West
2014	Brulé Tribal Rhythm 2
2016	Brulé Tribe

=== Other releases ===
Year	Title
2004	The Collection (best of Brulé CD)
2005	Hidden Heritage The Story of Paul LaRoche (book)
2006	Brulé & AIRO 2006 Holiday Tour (DVD)
2007	Mt. Rushmore – Concert for Reconciliation of the cultures (Brulé & AIRO Concert DVD & CD)
2007	Brulé & AIRO 2007 Holiday Tour (Concert DVD)
2011	Brulé Live from Branson (Concert DVD)
2012	A Brulé Christmas (DVD)

== Personnel ==
=== Current band members ===
- Paul LaRoche- Piano, Electronic keyboards, Vocals (1995–present) also the band's songwriter and producer
- Nicole LaRoche- Classical flute (1995–present) Does not use a wood flute as is most associated with the culture. Instead uses a steel European flute to emulate sound of the wood flute.
- Shane LaRoche- Lead guitar (2002–present) Performs on the acoustic guitar, nylon string guitar and electric guitar.
- Vlasis Pergakis – Traditional Drum (2011–Present) from Minneapolis, Minnesota also plays Electric and acoustic guitar as well and also has completed some miscellaneous side music projects which resulted in 2 CD's: Plain Sight and White Dog.

=== Past Band members ===
- Moses Brings Plenty- Traditional drum, Vocals (2006–2010) Each traditional drum is respected and cared for in the traditional ways of the Native people. Moses is from the Oglala Sioux Tribe, Pine Ridge Reservation
- Clay Brian- Traditional drum (2007–2009). Clay is from the Rosebud Sioux Tribal reservation
- Kristé Belt- Vocalist (2006–2008)
- Kurt Olsen- Drum kit (2007–2011) from Minneapolis, Minnesota performs with the group at larger shows
- John LoneEagle *-Traditional drum, & Vocals (2001–2006)

                    Nicole and Shane are enrolled members of the Lower Brule Sioux Tribe of South Dakota

=== Dance troupe ===
These dancers perform with the group several times throughout the year and represent several tribes
Thirza Defoe- Hoop dance, fancy shawl dance, Eagle dance
Petur Redbird- Men's Traditional dance
Lewis St. Cyr- Chicken dance, grass dance, men's fancy feather dance, hoop dance
Lowery Begay- Hoop dance, men's fancy feather dance
Therese St. Cyr- Jingle dress dance, women's traditional dance
Garan Coons- Chicken dance, men's fancy feather dance
Gentry St. Cyr- Chicken dance, grass dance, men's fancy feather dance
Linda Thompson- Women's traditional dance (Paul's cousin)
Rene Avila- Men's Aztec dance
Jade Summers- Jingle dress dance (Nicole's Daughter)
Emily Sinclair- Jingle dress dance (Linda's granddaughter)

== Awards and nominations ==
- First American's in the Arts Awards:
  - Won: Best Outstanding Performance (1999) for One Nation
- Native American Music Awards (NAMA/NAMMYS):
  - Nominated: Songwriter of the Year (2000) for Paul LaRoche & Robby Bee One Nation
  - Nominated: Duo or Group of the Year (2000) for Brulé One Nation
  - Nominated: Best Pop/Rock Recording (2000) for Brulé One Nation
  - Nominated: Flutist of the Year (2001) for Nicole Passion Spirit
  - Won: Group of the Year (2002) for Brulé Star People
  - Won: Best Instrumental CD (2002) for Brulé Star People
  - Nominated: Record of the Year (2002) for Brulé Star People
  - Nominated: Songwriter of the Year (2002) for Paul LaRoche Star People
  - Nominated: Best Female Artist (2003) for Nicole Night Tree
  - Won: Best Instrumental CD (2003) for Nicole Night Tree
  - Nominated: Best Producer (2003) for Paul LaRoche Night Tree
  - Nominated: Record of the Year (2003) for Nicole Night Tree
  - Nominated: Best Instrumental CD (2006) for Brulé The Collection
  - Won: Best Compilation CD (2006) for Brulé The Collection
  - Nominated: Song of the Year (2006) for Brulé Stomp Dance from The Collection
  - Nominated: Best Instrumental CD (2006) for AIRO Tatanka
  - Won: Duo or Group of the Year (2006) for AIRO Tatanka
  - Nominated: Artist of the Year (2007) for Paul LaRoche Kinship
  - Won: Duo or Group of the Year (2007) for Brulé & AIRO Silent Star Night
  - Nominated: Best Instrumental CD (2007) for Brulé & AIRO Silent Star Night
  - Won: Best New Age CD (2007) for Brulé Kinship
  - Nominated: Record of the Year (2007) for Brulé & AIRO Silent Star Night
- Aboriginal People's Choice Awards:
  - Nominated: Best Instrumental CD (2007) for Brulé & AIRO Silent Star Night
