= List of shakuhachi players =

List of instrumentalists

The following is a list of notable shakuhachi and hotchiku players, arranged by surname.

== B ==
- Clive Bell
- Christopher Yohmei Blasdel
- Cornelius Boots (Cornelius Shinzen Boots)

== D ==
- Watazumi Doso

== E ==
- Douglas Ewart

== H ==
- Joji Hirota

== I ==
- Yoshikazu Iwamoto

== J ==
- Phil Nyokai James

== K ==
- Kaoru Kakizakai
- Daisuke Kaminaga
- Masayuki Koga
- Kinko Kurosawa

== L ==
- Ken LaCosse
- Riley Lee

== M ==
- Kōhachiro Miyata
- Minoru Muraoka

== N ==
- John Kaizan Neptune

== O ==
- Atsuya Okuda

== R ==
- Randy Raine-Reusch
- Alcvin Ramos
- Brian Ritchie (Brian Tairaku Ritchie)
- Rodrigo Rodriguez
- Ned Rothenberg

== S ==
- James Nyoraku Schlefer
- Ronnie Nyogetsu Reishin Seldin

== Y ==
- Gorō Yamaguchi
- Hōzan Yamamoto
- Katsuya Yokoyama
- Masakazu Yoshizawa

== See also ==
- Shakuhachi
