= Kokū =

Kokū (虚空) or Koku is a honkyoku, a solo "original piece" of Japanese Buddhist origin for the shakuhachi, a bamboo flute. The title "Kokū" is often translated as "empty sky".

According to legend , "Kokū" is one of the three original shakuhachi pieces, along with "Mukaiji" and "Kyorei". It was composed by Kyochiku, the Zen priest who founded the Myoan temple in Kyoto, Japan in the 13th century. Kyochiku fell asleep while practicing shakuhachi inside the temple at Ise, Mie and upon awakening, transcribed the sounds in his dream into the three pieces "Kokū", "Kyorei", and "Mukaiji".

"Kokū" has been recorded by many shakuhachi artists, including Watazumi Doso, Yokoyama Katsuya, Nishimura Koku, Ronnie Nyogetsu Seldin, Okuda Atsuya, Phil Nyokai James and Alcvin Takegawa Ramos.

== See also ==
- Fuke Zen
