= Alcvin Ramos =

Alcvin Ryuzen Ramos is a shakuhachi teacher, performer, composer, and maker based in Canada. Born in Japan, Ramos has also lived in the United States and now lives in Western Canada. In 2003, he founded the Bamboo-In Shakuhachi Space on the Sunshine Coast.

Ramos studied shakuhachi in Japan under several teachers, including Kaoru Kakizakai, Teruo Furuya, Atsuya Okuda, Yoshinobu Taniguchi and more recently with Takashi Tokuyama. He received his shihan (master) license from Kaoru Kakizakai and Katsuya Yokoyama. Ramos received an honorary Dai Shihan (grand master) title from Yoshinobu Taniguchi, taking the name, "Ryuzen" (Dragon Meditation) making him the first Canadian and one of only a handful of non-Japanese to receive this honor. He also cites Watazumi Doso, teacher of Yokoyama, and his Dokyoku honkyoku repertoire as a strong influence.

In addition to teaching, performing and composing, Ramos is a shakuhachi flute craftsman, specializing in the hocchiku variety of jinashikan (natural bore flutes, "without ji" or paste). Ramos is currently studying jiari shakuhachi construction with Miura Ryuho in Akita Prefecture.

Ramos also plays shinobue (a Japanese side-blown flute), Shinkin (three-stringed fretted, Chinese lute), and Tsugaru Shamisen (Japanese spiked lute). He is the inventor of the Tenkan, a shakuhachi/didgeridoo hybrid flute.

Ramos latest release (2021) is called "Kitsune" with Italian ambient music producer, jarguna (Marco Billi) on Projekt Records.

Ramos is married to the ceramic artist, Sandra Ramos.

== Discography ==
- "Japanese Traditional Koto and Shakuhachi Music". Satomi Saeki (koto) & Alcvin Takegawa Ramos (shakuahchi). Oliver Sudden Productions Inc. 2005.
- "Ontophony". Mearingstone, Uzume Taiko, Alcvin Takegawa Ramos, & Duncan Miller. 2006.
- "Japanese Traditional Flute for Meditation; Zen Shakuhachi Vol.1 ". Alcvin Takegawa Ramos Oliver Sudden Productions Inc. 2007.
- "Japanese Traditional Flute for Meditation; Zen Shakuhachi Vol.2". Alcvin Takegawa Ramos. Oliver Sudden Productions Inc. 2008.
- "Japanese Bamboo Flute: Shakuhachi" Alcvin Ryuzen Ramos. Oliver Sudden Productions Inc. 2011.
- "Kitsune" jarguna + Alcvin Ryuzen Ramos. Projekt Records Inc. 2021
