= Puhua =

Legendary Chinese Zen master

- Zhenzhou Puhua (鎮州普化)
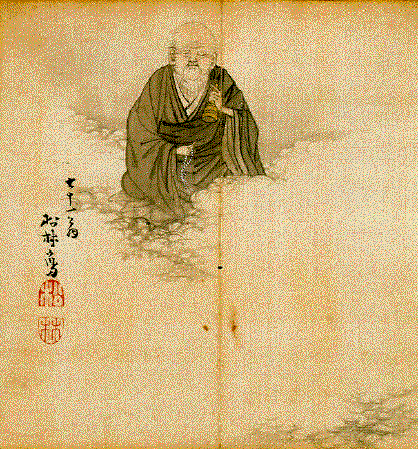
- A depiction of the folkloric Puhua (Fuke in Japanese) in the clouds, ringing his hand-bell with a clapper (called to in Chinese, taku in Japanese).

Personal life
- Born: 770 China (Tang dynasty)
- Died: Ambiguous (840 or 860) _{– {see below}} China (Tang dynasty)

Religious life
- Religion: Buddhism
- School: Mahāyāna
- Lineage: Chan/Zen
- Sect: Linji/Rinzai
- Monastic name: Puhua Chanshi (Fuke-Zenji)
- Profession: Mendicant, Chan master, religious leader

Senior posting
- Teacher: Panshan Baoji, Linji Yixuan
- Predecessor: Panshan Baoji
- Successor: Debatable/Ambiguous: Ennin and/or Zhang Bai and/or Chang Po (Chōhaku)
- Students: Ennin, Zhang Bai, Chang Po (Chōhaku)

Military service
- Rank: 1st 'Patriarch' of Fuke Zen

Zhenzhou Puhua (Chinese: traditional: 鎮州普化, simplified: 普化, pinyin: Zhenzhou Pǔhuà; Japanese: Jinshu Fuke, honorifically Fuke Zenji (lit. "Zen master Fuke")—allegedly ca. 770–840 or 860), also called P'u-k'o, and best known by his Japanese name, Fuke, was a Chinese Chan (Zen) master, monk-priest, wanderer and eccentric, mentioned in the Record of Linji (臨剤録, C. Linji lu, J. Rinzai roku). Fuke was used to create a legend for the komusō samurai-monks that appeared in Edo-period Japan. They used their self-named Fuke Zen to establish a constructed connection to Japanese Rinzai Zen Buddhism in the 17th or 18th century. The legend is written in the Kyotaku Denki (虚鐸伝記), first published in 1795 together with a "Japanese Translation" of the "original" in literary Chinese (kanbun). The original text may have been written in the middle of the 17th century, but there are no historic texts to support this. For the komusō (虚無僧) samurai-monks, he was considered the traditional antecedent—at least in spiritual, mythological, or philosophical terms—of their order, which was formally established in Edo Japan. It is possible that the ideological roots of the sect derived from the Rinzai poet and iconoclast Ikkyū and the monk Shinchi Kakushin (心地覺心) who traveled to and from China and Japan in the 13th century. Still, according to some accounts, the sect is simply a more direct derivative of the Rinzai school and its teachings.

The few records of Puhua's life and affairs are those accounted, if only briefly, in several East Asian religious or historical references. One of the only credible sources on his life is to be found in the Tang dynasty Record of Linji (Records of Rinzai), wherein he is portrayed as an obscure student and eventual dharma heir of Panshan Baoji (盤山寶積), as well as a friend, colleague, student and/or contemporary of Linji Yixuan, who founded the Linji (臨済宗, J. Rinzai) tradition of Chan Buddhism in China. This implies that he may have been a real individual.

The legends surrounding Puhua were more recently mentioned in the Monumenta Nipponica, R.H. Blyth's A History of Haiku (published in 1963) as well as some of the writings of Osho, along with later publications concerning the Fuke-shū, the shakuhachi and related topics. In 1988 a shakuhachi learning and playing manual co-authored by the shakuhachi performer Christopher Yohmei Blasdel and the scholar Kamisango Yūkō was published; the work is entitled The Shakuhachi: A Manual for Learning (ISBN 978-1933606156), and thoroughly details the historicity of Fuke/Puhua and the precursors to Fuke Zen in China.

== Life and legends ==
=== Sources for the life of Puhua ===
There are two main sources for the life of Puhua: one is the aforementioned Linji lu or Record of Linji from China. The Linji lu is an important document in regards to Chinese Chan (Zen) Buddhism. Thus, if Puhua actually existed, his life may best be known by way of the Record of Linji. There is also Kyotaku Denki Kokuji Kai from Japan, which connects the legend of Fuke (Japanese version of the name Puhua) and the transmission and transformation of the Fuke sect in Japan, in particular with regard to the legendary origin of the Komuso tradition and suizen ("blowing Zen"). The notion of suizen is however a concept from the 20th century, and was not used in the Edo period.

While there is much disparity between the two texts, they do agree on at least one issue: In both the Record and Kyotaku Denki the notion of Puhua being an eccentric imbued with a sort of crazy wisdom, and perhaps even an iconoclast, is supported. Yet the texts again diverge on the issue of Fuke's influence on the Fuke sect of Japan: While the Kyotaku Denki directly attributes the founding of the school to him, the Fuke sect did not exist in China and as such he is never mentioned to be the leader of a separate religious tradition in the Linji lu. Although this is the case, the Record does provide certain subtleties regarding Puhua as being a person of his own, self-directed character who often did things ubiquitously and ignored social norms and doctrinal establishments.

The following account of Puhua's life is an amalgamation of the accounts featured in both the Record and Kyotaku Denki, although it includes some outside references as well.

=== Historical accounts ===
Puhua is said to have been born in Tang dynasty China in the year 770. It is not known where he was born, however his name, Zhenzhou, possibly references Zhengzhou, a city in the modern Henan province of north-central China. The Kyotaku Denki states that he lived in "Chen Province". Coincidentally, there is a village known as Chen by the Yellow River in Henan. Furthermore, one of Puhua's supposed students, Chang Po (Japanese: Chōhaku; also stylized Cho Haku, Chohaku or Chō Haku and sometimes referred to as, simply, Haku) is said to have lived in Henan (also transliterated as Ho Nan).

One account states that Puhua lived in and traveled through an area known as "Toh" in China.

In the Record of Linji Puhua is noted as being a student and dharma heir of Panshan Baoji (who by some accounts is either the same person as, or different from, another Chan patriarch by the name of Baizhang Huaihai) alongside two other dharma heirs: Huangbo and Linji. Puhua's own group of students reportedly included several individuals whose historicity is also dubious: "Ennin", "Chang Po" (Chōhaku) and "Zhang Bai" (whose name is also stylized as Zhang Bo). (At least one, if not all of these individuals is implied to have been Puhua's heir and purportedly passed on his legacy to many more disciples and eventually the komusō.)

Puhua is said to have been not only a contemporary of Linji/Rinzai, but also one of his students. Thus Puhua is sometimes included in the fold of the Linji zong (Japanese: Rinzai shū) in certain chronicles, as well as Huineng's "Sudden Enlightenment" school because it is, in some respects, an antecedent for the Rinzai school to begin with, and especially influenced Linji's eponymous tradition in the Tang dynasty, where and when Puhua and Linji lived. (Not surprisingly, the Japanese komusō samurai-monks of the Edo period considered itself a delineation of the Rinzai sect. Their self-named Fuke sect was never recognised by the authorities.)

Puhua was reputedly a multi-talented monk and priest, known for being inventive, intelligent and at the same time quite strict. He is characterized by all accounts to have been a spontaneous individual who demonstrated a unique style of non-verbal communication that is an important aspect of Chan/Zen Buddhist philosophy and historically the staple teaching method of the Chan and Zen Patriarchs and even Bodhidharma (an Indian monk and the ostensible founder of Chan/Zen Buddhism) himself. The Kyotaku Denki reinforces this characteristic, stating that Puhua "was pleased with his uninhibited Zen spirit."

This kind of capriciousness can be gleaned from a legend regarding Puhua wherein he is attending the deathbed of his master Panshan:

When Panshan Baoji was near death, he said to the monks, "Is there anyone among you who can draw my likeness?"

Many of the monks made drawings for Panshan, but none were to his liking.

The monk Puhua stepped forward and said, "I can draw it."

Panshan said, "Why don't you show it to me?"

Puhua then turned a somersault and went out.

Panshan said, "Someday, that fellow will teach others in a crazy manner!"

Having said these words, Panshan passed away.

Many stories about Puhua that appear in the Record of Linji add to his reputation of having a rough and uncompromising manner of expressing the dharma. For example:

44.a. One day the master (Linji Yixuan) and Puhua went to a vegetarian banquet given them by a believer. During it, the master asked Puhua: "'A hair swallows the vast ocean, a mustard seed contains Mt. Sumeru' – does this happen by means of supernatural powers, or is the whole body (substance, essence) like this?" Puhua kicked over the table. The master said: "Rough fellow." Puhua retorted: "What place is this here to speak of rough and refined?"

b. The next day, they went again to a vegetarian banquet. During it, the master asked: "Today's fare, how does it compare with yesterday's?" Puhua (as before) kicked over the table. The master said: "Understand it you do – but still, you are a rough fellow." Puhua replied: "Blind fellow, does one preach of any roughness or finesse in the Buddha-Dharma?" The master stuck out his tongue.

There is some controversy as to the degree and nature of Puhua's musical talents, but his later "followers" (the monks of the Fuke sect in Japan) would often reflect on a certain story that appears in the Kyotaku Denki for inspiration.

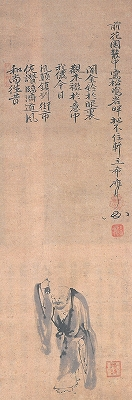
A 16th century Japanese depiction of Puhua (Fuke) by Seta Kamon, with commentary.

The story tells of Puhua going through his hometown, ringing a bell and reciting a gatha to summon others to enlightenment. The same, for many Fuke practitioners, applied to the shakuhachi through suizen (Japanese: 吹禅)—"blowing meditation" – a term coined in the 20th century – involving the use of the shakuhachi as a spiritual/religious instrument for meditation and as a way to attain bodhi, and its mastery was seen as a path to enlightenment:

Ringing a taku, he would go to town and say to passersby: "Myōtōrai myōtōda, antōrai antōda, Shihō hachimenrai (ya), senpūda, Kokūra[i] (ya), rengada. [This roughly translates to,] "If attacked in the light, I will strike back in the light. If attacked in the dark, I will strike in the dark. If attacked from all quarters, I will strike as a whirlwind does. If attacked from the empty sky, I will thrash with a flail."

One day, a man named Chō Haku of Ho Nan province heard these words and revered the priest Fuke for his great virtue. He appealed to the priest for permission to follow him, but the priest did not accept him.

Haku had previously had a taste for playing pipes. Having listened to the sound of the Priest's bell, he at once made a [bamboo] flute and imitated the sound. [Thereafter] he played the sound untiringly on the flute and never played other pieces

Since he made the sound of the bell on his flute, he named the flute kyotaku...

The term kyotaku means "empty bell" in Japanese. "Empty bell" can also be translated as Kyorei, which happens to be the name of one of the san koten honkyoku (Japanese: "three classic original pieces"; also known as the Bekkaku), honkyoku (Japanese: 本曲, "original pieces") being the traditional musical pieces for shakuhachi played by the mendicant monks of the Fuke sect for alms and enlightenment. The "three classic original pieces" are probably not as old as thought. The earliest reference to any pieces played by the komusō is from 1664, and in that text the so-called "three classics" are not mentioned. The earliest reference to these three pieces would than be the 1795 publication of the Kyotaku Denki Kokuji-kai.

Puhua's gatha is sometimes called "Shidanoge".

Another version of the story portrays Chō Haku attempting to become the student of Zhang Bai instead of Puhua directly, as in this version Zhang Bai is depicted as a student who garnered favor from Puhua and so had become admired by Chō Haku.

It was believed by the historical komusō that the tradition that led to suizen was handed down by Chō Haku through his family and eventually reached its way to Japan by way of the monk Kakushin, to the komusō and later the founder of Myoanji—at one time the head temple of the Fuke-shū in Kyoto and still a place of profound importance for many shakuhachi, Fuke Zen and Rinzai Zen enthusiasts the world over—Kyochiku Zenji (also known as Kichiku).

==== Death ====
Puhua's death is related as follows:

"One day at the street market Fuke was begging all and sundry to give him a robe. Everybody offered him one, but he did not want any of them. The master [Linji] made the superior buy a coffin, and when Fuke returned, said to him: "There, I had this robe made for you." Fuke shouldered the coffin, and went back to the street market, calling loudly: "Rinzai had this robe made for me! I am off to the East Gate to enter transformation" (to die)." The people of the market crowded after him, eager to look. Fuke said: "No, not today. Tomorrow, I shall go to the South Gate to enter transformation." And so for three days. Nobody believed it any longer. On the fourth day, and now without any spectators, Fuke went alone outside the city walls, and laid himself into the coffin. He asked a traveler who chanced by to nail down the lid. The news spread at once, and the people of the market rushed there. On opening the coffin, they found that the body had vanished, but from high up in the sky they heard the ring of his hand bell."

=== Legacy ===
Hisamatsu Fūyō (1791–1871), the factual leader of Kinko-ryū after the Kurosawa Kinko III writes the following regarding Fuke:

Q. "What kind of person was Fuke Zenji?"

A. "I do not know. Better ask someone with more knowledge of Zen."

Q. "Wasn't Fuke the ancestor of shakuhachi? If one follows this path but doesn't know its origins, is that not a sign of immaturity?"

A. "As for myself, because I understand the source of shakuhachi, I say I do not know Fuke. Fuke was an enlightened man, but I do not think he sought his enlightenment by playing shakuhachi. He cannot be compared to an ignorant blind person like me who plays shakuhachi because he enjoys it and has gradually come to know that shakuhachi is a Zen instrument. Even if Fuke had played shakuhachi, it would only have been a passing fancy. His practice of shakuhachi would not compare to my training for many years. If Fuke were to come alive again in this generation he would surely become my disciple and ask me to show him the way. If you look at records from the time of Fuke, and if you know all about his life, but you do not know his enlightenment, then you do not know Fuke. On the other hand, a person who knows nothing of his life, but knows his enlightenment, he knows Fuke. I do not know him yet."

== See also ==
- Buddhism in China
- Buddhism in Japan
- Fuke Zen
  - Komusō
  - Suizen
    - Shakuhachi
      - Hocchiku
    - Honkyoku
- Ikkyū
- List of Rinzai Buddhists
- Panshan Baoji
- Linder, Gunnar Jinmei (2012). Deconstructing Traditional Japanese Music: A Study on Shakuhachi, Historical Authenticity and Transmission of Tradition. Stockholm University, PhD Diss.
