= Shinkyoku =

Modern music for the Japanese shakuhachi

Shinkyoku (Japanese: 新曲 / しんきょく) are modern musical compositions for shakuhachi. The term is commonly used to describe early post-Meiji era compositions influenced by western music.

== See also ==
- Honkyoku (traditional, solo shakuhachi compositions)
- Sankyoku (ensemble compositions, for shakuhachi, koto and shamisen)
