= Minoru Muraoka =

Japanese jazz musician

Minoru Muraoka 村岡実
- Born: 1923; Yamada, Iwate, Japan
- Died: 2 January 2014 (aged 90)
- Genres: Jazz
- Occupation: Musician
- Instrument: Shakuhachi
- Years active: 1959–1982
- Labels: Columbia; Denon; Victor; Teichiku; United Artists; King; Mr Bongo; Toshiba; Canyon; Polydor; Toho; Yupiteru; Maxim; Daiei
- Formerly of: The New Dimensions; The Life Theaters
- Spouse: Chiaki Muraoka

Minoru Muraoka (村岡実, Muraoka Minoru; 1923 – 2 January 2014) was a Japanese shakuhachi player. He became well known for using the shakuhachi to play jazz music, which was influential on popularizing the instrument in contemporary Japanese music.

== Life and career ==
Minoru Muraoka was born in 1923 in Yamada, Japan. Muraoka learned from folk singer Tansui Kikuchi to play folk songs in the classical style of Nakao Tozan on the shakuhachi, a Japanese end-blown flute. He worked in the editorial department of Zen-On Music Company until 1959.

In 1962, Muraoka joined a shakuhachi trio called Shakuhachi San-Jyuso-dan, together with Katsuya Yokoyama and Kohachiro Miyata, with the aim of popularizing the instrument. In 1964, he went on to become a freelancer and recording artist, and had several popular songs in Japan such as "Ju", "Oyaji no Umi", and "Yosaku". He also played shakuhachi on Hibari Misora's Japan Record Award-winning song "Soft". Muraoka released Harlem Nocturne, one of the first shakuhachi jazz albums, through Columbia Records in 1967. In the late 1960s, as part of the group The Life Theaters, he released the album Shakuhachi Rock.

Muraoka recorded and privately released his live album Osorezan, which was dedicated to Mount Osore, in April 1970. It was reissued through Yupiteru Records in 1976 as Osorezan Suite. His next album, Bamboo, was released later that year as part of the "New Emotional Work Series" for United Artists, and included covers of Dave Brubeck's "Take Five" and "The House of the Rising Sun". The album was later reissued in 2019 through Mr Bongo Records. He formed the group the New Dimensions in 1970, who released 11 albums, including 1972's Yuri Furi Suri. He released the album So in 1973, and he and the New Dimensions collaborated with jazz flautist Herbie Mann on his album Gagaku & Beyond, which was recorded in 1974 and released in 1976 through the Atlantic Records subsidiary label Finnadar.

Muraoka died on 2 January 2014 at 90 years old due to multiple organ failure.

== Musical style ==
Muraoka's music was mostly jazz, but included elements from a variety of other genres, including folk, pop, rock, psychedelia, enka, and free jazz. He first started playing jazz music with the shakuhachi in the late 1950s, and his music has been considered influential on popularizing the shakuhachi in contemporary Japanese music. His 1967 album Shakuhachi Rock was his first foray into jazz-rock, while his 1970 album Bamboo combined jazz-funk with psychedelic rock. Other instruments used in Muraoka's music, specifically with his group the New Dimensions, were electric bass, organ, shō, shinobue, koto, shamisen, and taiko. Muraoka's music was described by Now-Again Records founder Egon as "haunting, difficult-to-compare music that you file as 'jazz' only by default."
