= Ichigatsu-ji =

Buddhist temple in Chiba Prefecture, Japan

Coordinates: 35°49′N 139°55′E

Ichigatsu-ji 一月寺
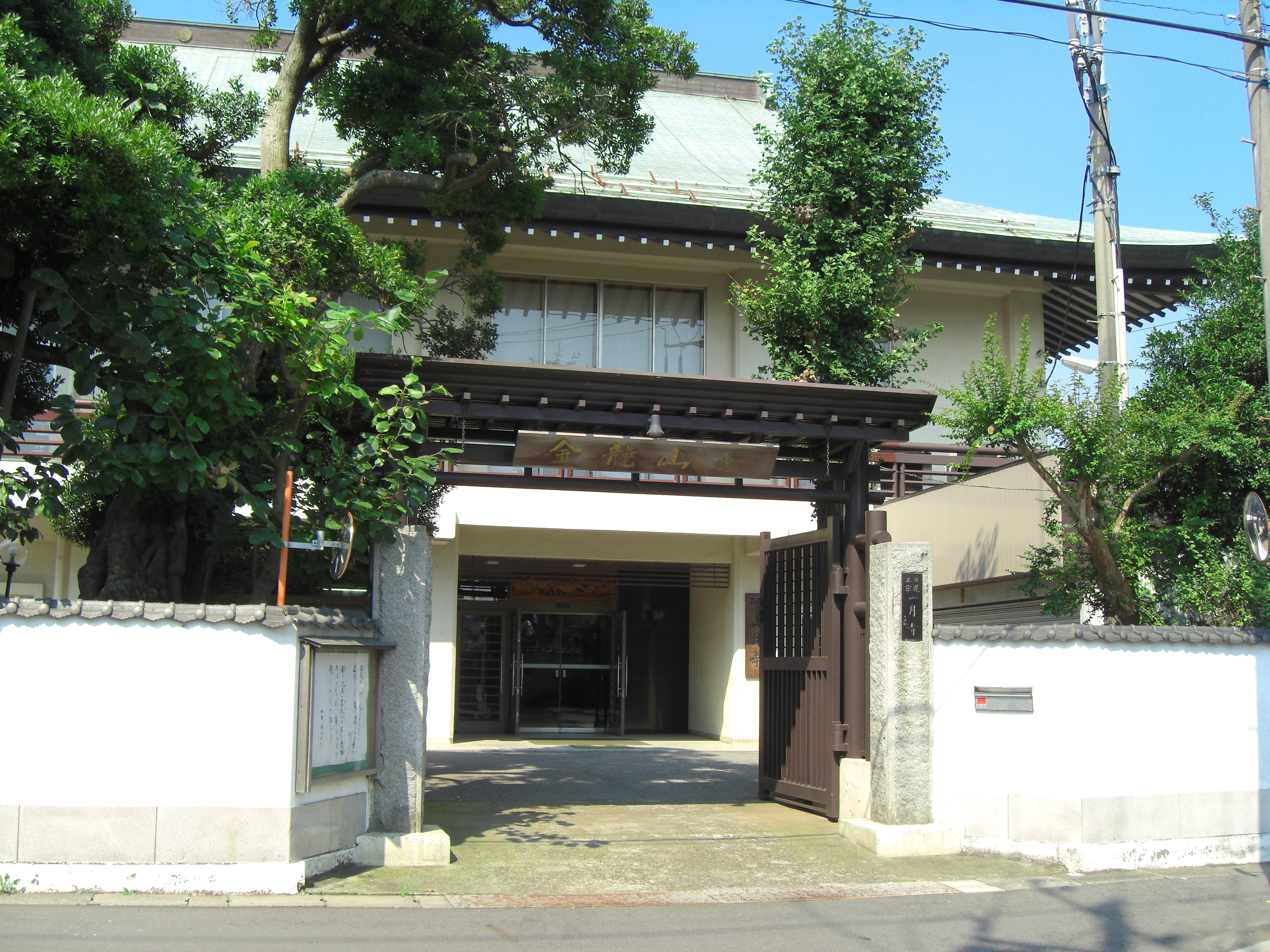
- Ichigatsu-ji

Religion
- Affiliation: Nichiren Shōshū

Location
- Location: Kogane 242, Matsudo, Chiba Prefecture
- Country: Japan
- Interactive map of Ichigatsu-ji 一月寺

Architecture
- Completed: 1257-1259

Ichigatsu-ji (一月寺) is a Buddhist temple located in the city of Matsudo in Chiba Prefecture, Japan. It was the home temple of the Fuke sect of Zen Buddhism.

The Fuke sect featured distinctive mendicant komusō monks, who wore a distinctive basket covering the head and played a shakuhachi. Kanto-area komusō were based mainly in Ichigatsu-ji and Reibō-ji in present-day Tokyo. Monks of the sect were allowed to travel the country freely by the Tokugawa Bakufu, and were frequently utilized by the government as spies. Due to its negative association with the Tokugawa government, the sect was abolished at the end of the Edo period, and Ichigatsu-ji ceased to function as a Fuke temple, and was taken over by the Nichiren Shōshū sect of Buddhism.
