= Kokutai (disambiguation) =

Kokutai is a Japanese term. It may refer to:

- Kokutai, a Japanese word used during the second half of the 19th century and first half of the 20th century to refer to the emperor sovereignty
- Kokutai, a Japanese abbreviation for the National Sports Festival of Japan (国民体育大会, Kokumin Taiiku Taikai)
- Kokutai-ji, 国泰寺 (meaning Temple of National Peace)
- Kōkūtai (Naval Air Group), a type of aerial combat unit used by the Imperial Japanese Navy Air Service during World War II. Current Japan Air Self Defense Force.
