= Nakao Tozan =

Japanese shakuhachi performer (1876-1956)

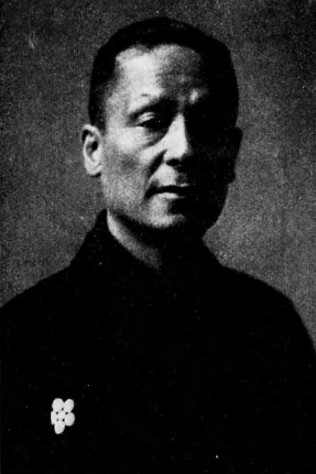
Tozan Nakao

Rinzō Nakao (known professionally as Nakao Tozan, 中尾都山, October 5, 1876 in Ōsaka prefecture to October 10, 1956 in Kyōto, aged 80), was the founder of the most important school of shakuhachi playing in late-nineteenth to mid-twentieth-century Japan and was both a performer and prolific composer. His influence continues to the present day.

== Life ==
Rinzō Nakao was born in 1876 in Suita-Gun (present-day Hirakata City), near Ōsaka, the second son of Nakao Jirohei and his wife Mitsu. His father was a merchant and his mother an accomplished shamisen player who knew Sōetsu Kondō, himself the founder of a shakuhachi school. In his childhood Rinzō learnt shakuhachi and violin whilst his mother taught him to sing traditional Jiuta.

At the age of nineteen Rinzō Nakao was initiated as a komusō, a Buddhist monk and practitioner of suizen, at Tōfuku-ji temple in Kyōto. This was an unusually young age for initiation and recognised his already highly developed musical talent. He was given the professional name of Tozan at this time. He then spent two years as a komusō wandering through south Japan before returning to Ōsaka in 1896 where he founded the Tozan-ryū, or Tozan school, on 15 February 1896.

Tozan continued to study Jiuta singing and developed his new notational system for shakuhachi during this period.

== New Japanese Music and compositions for shakuhachi ==
In July 1904 Tozan published his first original composition, a duo, "Seigaiha" (The Wave of the Blue Sea). This patriotic composition was inspired by the battle of Ryojunkō (in English, the Battle of Port Arthur, 8 to 9 February 1904) which marked the beginning of the Russo-Japanese War (1904–05). In October 1904 Tozan composed his most famous piece, "Iwashimizu" (Clear Mountain Spring). This celebrated the Iwashimizu Hachimangū Temple in Kyōto of which he was a patron. There is a memorial tablet to Tozan at the Temple.

He went on to compose some 300 original pieces for shakuhachi, both solo honkyoku pieces and the majority with ensemble.

The Tozan school became very successful and from 1912 he admitted only the most advanced students. After 1915 Tozan undertook concert tours of Korea, Formosa and Russia, as well as throughout Japan.

Tozan promoted and developed the "New Japanese Music" of the time – western-influenced music that became popular following the Meiji Restoration – and collaborated from 1925 onwards with the koto-virtuoso and composer Michio Miyagi. In his compositions, the shakuhachi moved away from its roots as traditional komusō suizen practice and became part of bourgeois music performance. In 1922 he moved the school to Tōkyō. In 1952 he received first prize from the Japan Arts Institute of Tōkyō, Japan's highest cultural award. After World War II the school was moved to Kyōto, where Tozan died on October 10, 1956.

The Tozan school was characterised by its willingness to accept students from a wide variety of social backgrounds as distinct from the earlier exclusively samurai tradition of the komusō. Its influence continues to the present day.

== Works of the Tozan school ==
In her monograph Die Solo-Honkyoku der Tozan-Schule (originally published in 1979 with a second edition in 2005), Ingrid Fritsch lists twelve original solo pieces from the Tozan school. There are eight solo works by Tozan Nakao (including one in collaboration with Hōzan Kubo) and four works credited to other Tozan-school composers:

1. Tsuru no Sugomori 鶴の巣籠 (Cranes Nesting, based on a Meianryū piece)
2. Kōgetsuchō 慷月調 (Generous Moon) (March 1904)
3. Iwashimizu 岩清水 (Iwashimizu temple) (October 1904)
4. Kangetsu 寒月(Midwinter Moon) (February 1911)
5. Yoru no Omoi 夜の懐 (Night Heart) (January 1917)
6. Yoru no Umi 夜の海 (Night Sea) (with Hōzan Kubo) (July 1921)
7. Kogarashi 木枯 (A Cold Wind Announces Winter) (November 1923)
8. Yumeji 夢路 (Dream Road) [by Kōzan Kanamori] (June 1933)
9. Miyama no Akatsuki 深山の暁 (Mount Miyama at Dawn) [by Kazushige Miyazagi] (September 1935)
10. Mine no Tsuki 峰の月 (Moon over the Peak) (Summer of 1946)
11. Shūfūgin 秋風吟 (Song of the Autumn Wind) [by Kōzan Kanamori] (October 1954)
12. Shinsenchōtanshō 神仙調短章 (The Divine Hermit - A Short Tonal Study) [by Ichizan Hoshida] (1957)

In addition, Fritsch lists 39 duos, five trios, two quartets and one quintet. The list of works published by the International Shakuhachi Society is somewhat divergent (this has not yet been examined in detail).

== See also ==
- Honkyoku
- Jiuta
- Komusō
- Shakuhachi
- Traditional Japanese Musical Instruments
