= Phil Nyokai James =

Professional Shakuhachi teacher and performer as well as avant-garde composer

Phil Nyokai James is a professional shakuhachi (Japanese bamboo flute) teacher and performer as well as avant-garde composer. Born in New York City in 1954, James studied shakuhachi with Ronnie Nyogetsu Reishin Seldin and Yodo Kurahashi. After receiving his master's license (shihan level), he began teaching and performing throughout the United States. His shakuhachi dojo is in Portland, Maine.

== Discography ==
- dreaming of waking up. Phil James (solo shakuahchi), 2008.
- First Places. Phil James (solo shakuahchi), 2001.
- Already Gone. Phil James, 1999. For shakuhachi, Native American flute, pedal steel guitar, shakuhachi, drums, turntables, and electronics.

== Selected Compositions ==
- Loudmouths, 2009, for four tenor saxophones.
- Simple Song, 2009, for flute with violin, cello, and piano.
- Bang Bang, 2009, for two pianos.
- Theme and Variegations, 2009, for cello and marimba.
- Prelude for Guitar, 2009.
- Hon Shirabe, 2009, for trumpet and organ.
- String Quartet, 2008.
- Crystal Earth Drum, 2006, for electronics.
- Ishi (stones), 2004, for shinobue, shakuhachi, shō, kokyū, bass koto and percussion (o-daiko, tyappa, kin, and mokugyo).
- Quiet Music, 2004, for electronics (installation).
- You Were Dazzle, 2002, for untrained voices, shakuhachi, electric guitar, bass, cymbals, and video, 2002 (text by Carole Maso).
