= Myōan-ji =

Buddhist temple in Kyoto, Japan

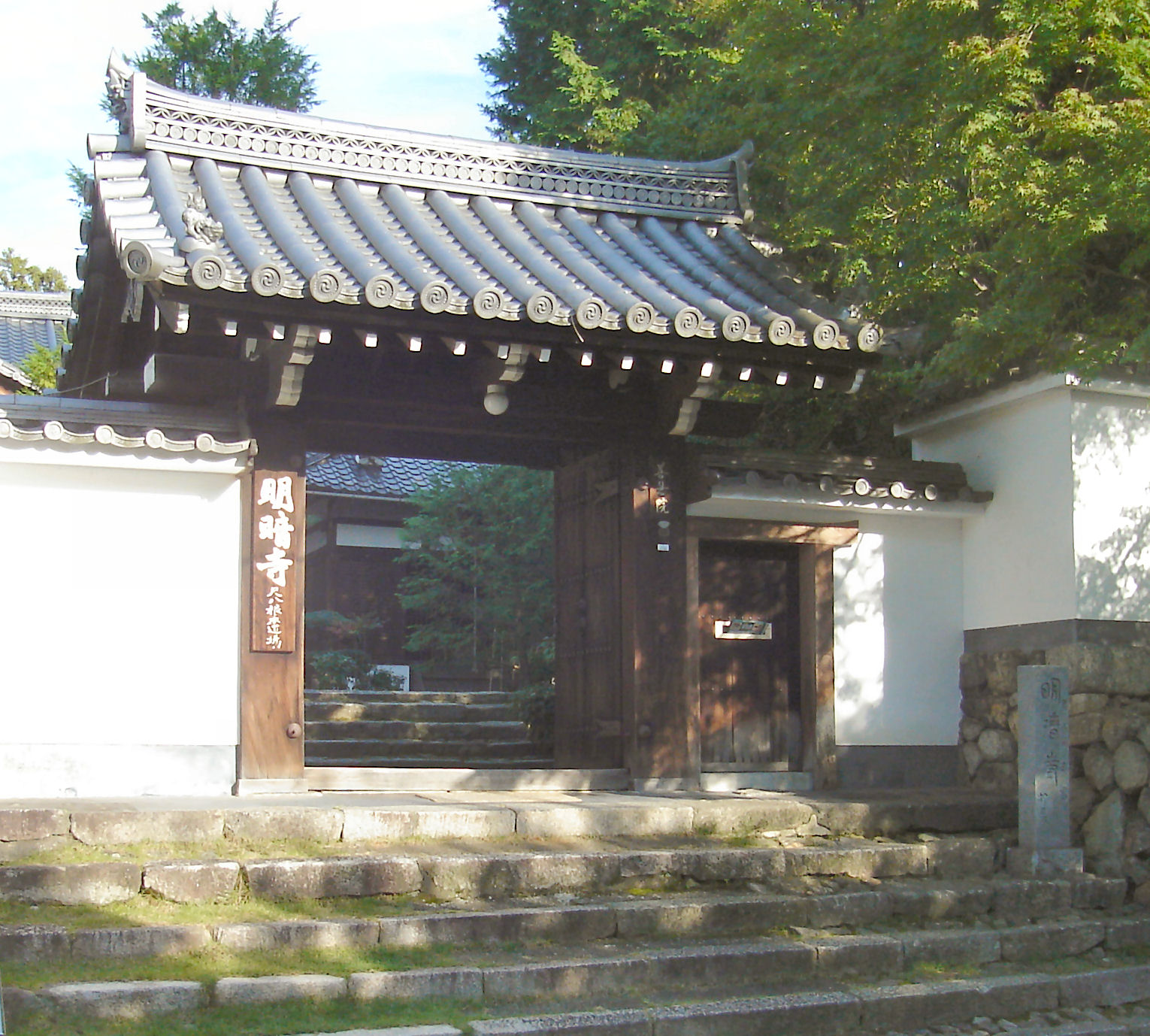

Religion
- Affiliation: Rinzai and Fuke Zen, Tōfuku-ji school

Location
- Country: Japan
- Interactive map of Myōan-ji

Architecture
- Founder: Kichiku (Kyochiku Zenji)

Myōan-ji (Japanese: 明暗寺, "Temple of Light and Darkness") is a Buddhist temple located in Kyoto, Japan. Myōan-ji is a sub-temple of Tōfuku-ji, and contained within the larger Tōfuku-ji temple complex, located in Higashiyama ward. It is the former headquarters and the premier pilgrimage site of the Fuke sect of Rinzai Zen. The temple was founded by the komusō and Zen master Kichiku (known honorarily as Kyochiku Zenji)—in whose remembrance there is a small shrine contained within.

Myōan-ji contains at least several graves, including that of Jin Nyodo, a revered shakuhachi player who traveled Japan and consolidated many honkyoku.
