= Kaoru Kakizakai =

Internationally renowned performer and teacher of the shakuhachi

Kaoru Kakizakai (柿堺 香, Kakizakai Kaoru; born 1959 in Chichibu, Saitama Prefecture, Japan) is an internationally renowned performer and teacher of the shakuhachi, a traditional vertical bamboo flute of Japan.

Kakizakai studied under and recorded with Yokoyama Katsuya. He graduated from the NHK Traditional Music Conservatory and is a past winner of the Kumamoto All Japan Hougaku competition. Kakizakai has performed widely in Japan and abroad, notably as shakuhachi soloist in Toru Takemitsu's November Steps with the NHK Symphony Orchestra. As of 2006, he is a research fellow at the Tokyo College of Music. He is also full-time instructor for the International Shakuhachi Kenshukan and NHK Culture Centre, and President of the International Shakuhachi Kenshu-kan Chichibu School and Oizumigakuen School. He is a member of the regular faculty of the Shakuhachi Summer Camp of the Rockies in Colorado.

== Discography ==
- "Koten Shakuhachi". Victor - VZCG-304. 2003.
- "Koten Shakuhachi 2." Freekick - FRK-0901. 2009.
