= Shakuhachi musical notation =

Method of Shakuhachi musical notation

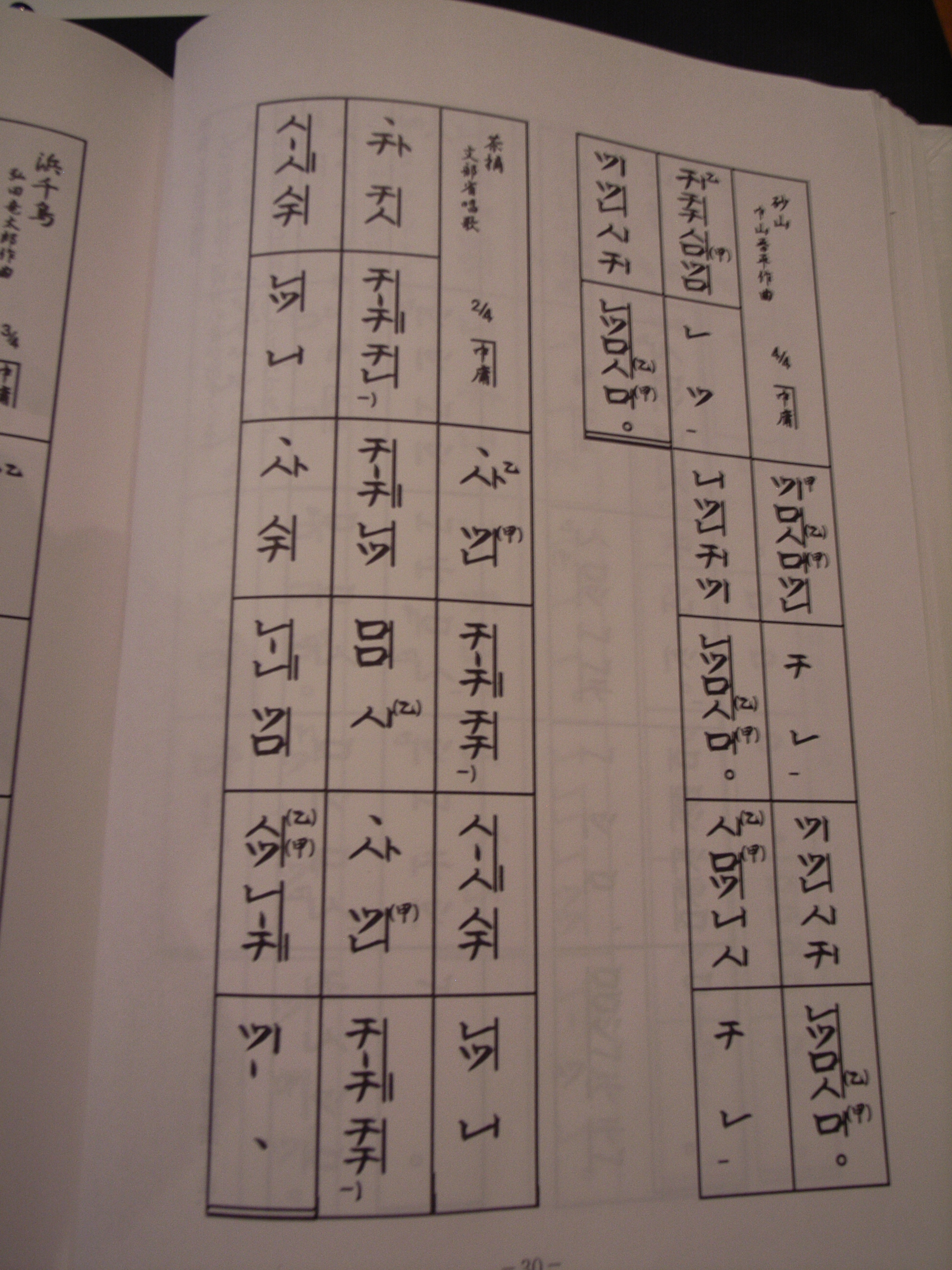
Shakuhachi score

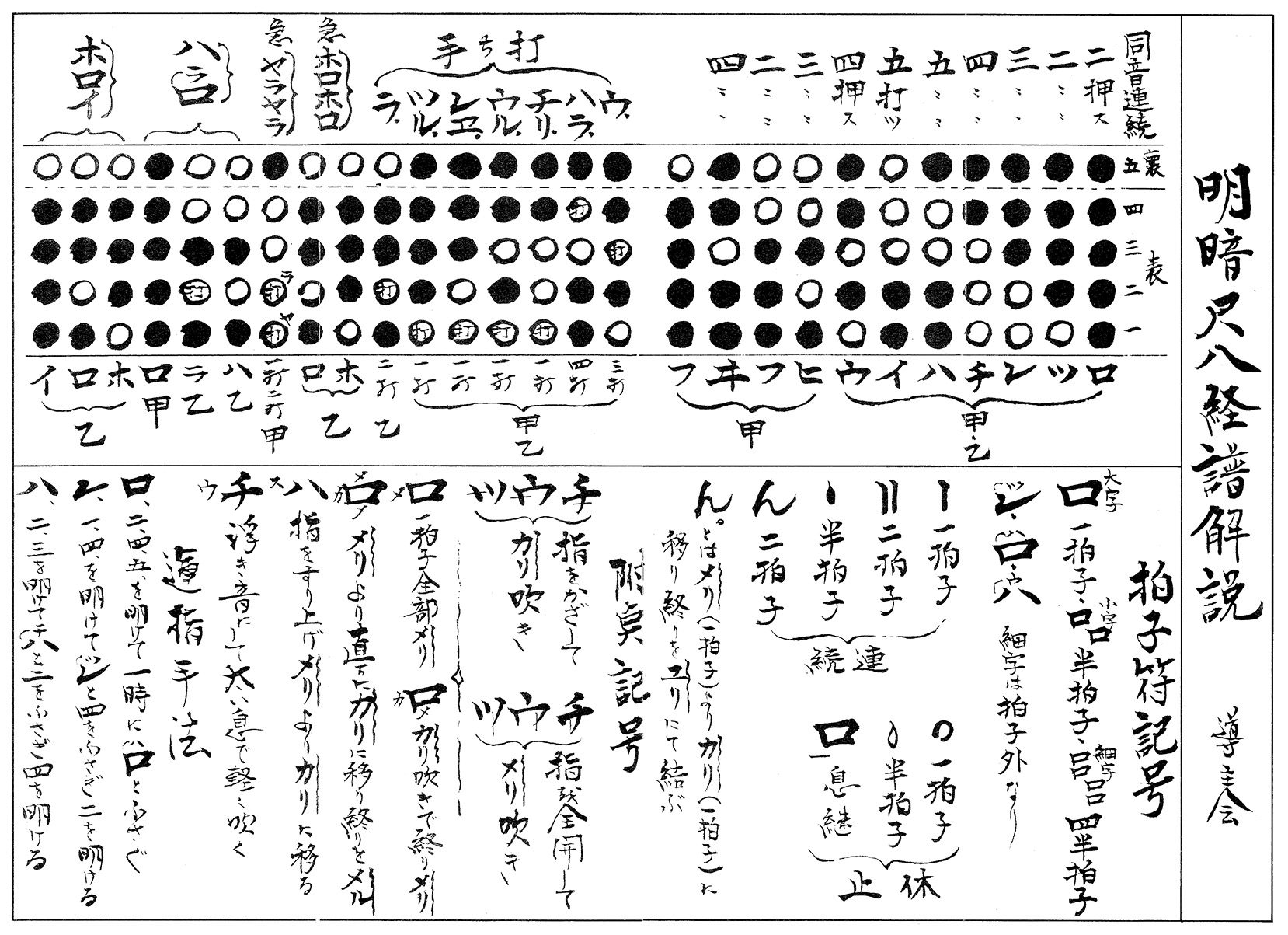
Myoan-ji fingering chart

Shakuhachi musical notation is a traditional tablature-style method of transcribing shakuhachi music.

A number of systems exist for notating shakuhachi music, most of which are based on the rotsure (ロツレ) and the fuho-u (フホウ) systems.

Traditional solo shakuhachi music (honkyoku) is transmitted as a semi-oral tradition; notation is often used as a mnemonic device. However, the master-disciple relationship is given emphasis within the tradition, and written sources are considered of little value 'without experience of the living tradition of actual training within the school'. In contrast to Western staff notation, shakuhachi playing instructions commonly indicate multiple fingerings resulting in various timbres for a given pitch, and microtonal slides between semitones.

Solo Kinko school honkyoku ("original pieces") generally do not feature an explicit beat. In some notation systems, nominal rhythmic values are given; musical importance ascribed to rhythmic markings varies depending on the lineage and/or teacher.

Staff notation and graphic notation are sometimes used to notate music for shakuhachi, usually in modern music when shakuhachi is used in conjunction with Western musical instruments.

Some current publishers of traditional shakuhachi honkyoku notation include the Chikuyūsha, Chikumeisha, Chikuhoryū, and the Kokusai Shakuhachi Kenshūkan.
