= Gorō Yamaguchi =

- Yamaguchi playing Japanese shakuhachi in c. 1967

Background information
- Born: February 26, 1933; Tokyo, Japan
- Origin: Japan
- Died: January 3, 1999 (aged 65)
- Genres: Japanese classical
- Occupation: Instrumentalist
- Instrument: Shakuhachi
- Years active: 1960s-1990s
- Labels: Japan Victor, Nonesuch

Gorō Yamaguchi (山口 五郎; February 26, 1933 – January 3, 1999) was a Japanese shakuhachi player who worked in both solo and ensemble performances. He was noted for his influential recordings of traditional Japanese music and one of his pieces was selected by NASA to be included on the Voyager Golden Record and launched into space.

== Career ==
Yamaguchi headed the Chikumeisha shakuhachi guild and became a world-famous Japanese performer and teacher. In 1967–1968, he was appointed Artist in Residence at Wesleyan University in Middletown, Connecticut, United States along with Yamada-school koto performers Namino Torii and Yamaguchi Hozomi, his wife.

While at Wesleyan, Yamaguchi recorded his LP, A Bell Ringing In The Empty Sky, which was released by Nonesuch Records on its Explorer Series. This was an influential first recording of shakuhachi in the United States; in 1977, NASA selected a honkyoku from the LP, "Tsuru No Sugomori" ("Depicting the Cranes in their Nest"), to be included on the Voyager Golden Record, a gold-plated copper record that was sent into space on the Voyager space craft. The record contained sounds and images which had been chosen as examples of the diversity of life and culture on Earth.

In 1992, the Japanese government designated Yamaguchi a Living National Treasure (Ningen Kokuhô).

== Major recordings ==
- A Bell Ringing In The Empty Sky Nonesuch Explorer Series H-72025
- Shakuhachi no Shinzui: Shakuhachi Honkyoku (Soul of Shakuhachi: Shakuhachi Honkyoku). Solo performance of complete Kinko school honkyoku repertoire: 38 compositions on 12 CDs. Boxed set with 44-page booklet. Japan Victor VZCG-8066-8077.
- Shakuhachi no Shinzui: Sankyoku Gassô (Soul of Shakuhachi: Trio Ensemble). Ensemble performances with voice, koto, and shamisen. Four CDs in boxed set with 44-page booklet. Japan Victor VZCG-8078-81.

== Audio link ==
- Brief excerpt from "Nesting of Cranes" perf. by Yamaguchi

== Obituaries ==
- Appreciation by Christopher Yohmei Blasdel
- Appreciation by Monty Levenson
