= Sankyoku =

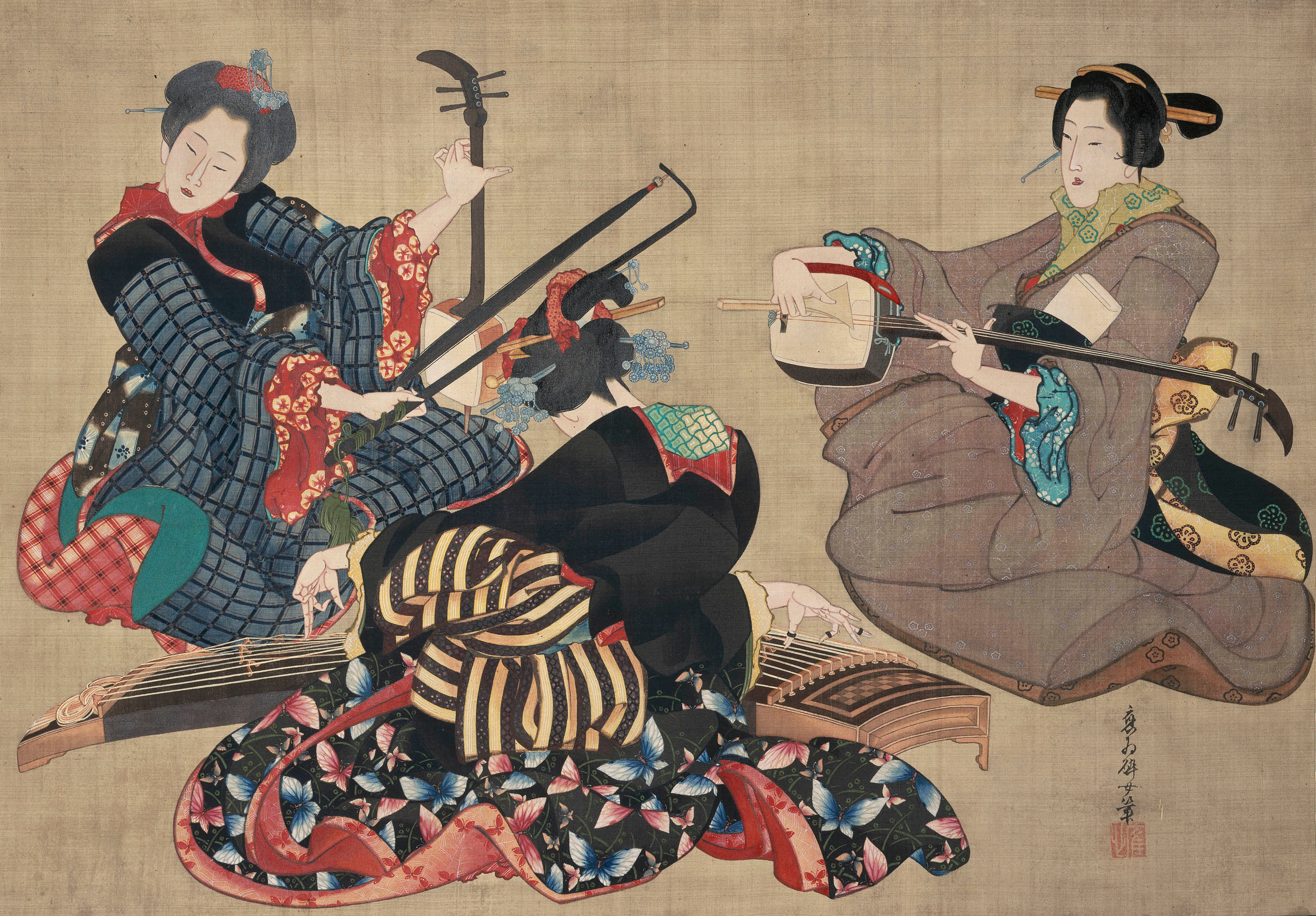
Katsushika Ōi"Pictorial evidence for sankyoku gassou"

Sankyoku (Japanese: 三曲 / さんきょく) is a form of Japanese chamber music played often with a vocal accompaniment. It is traditionally played on shamisen, koto, and kokyū, but more recently the kokyū has been replaced by shakuhachi.

== See also ==
- Music of Japan
