= Kokū Nishimura =

Japanese master shakuhachi flautist (1915–2002)

Kokū Nishimura (西村 虚空, Nishimura Kokū; 1915 – June 2002) was a master shakuhachi player, teacher, and craftsman.

Like his teacher, Kyochiku Tani, Nishimura became a komusō (a mendicant shakuhachi player). Nishimura wandered Japan as a mendicant for ten years.

Kyochiku Tani was trained in the Fuke sect. After the sect's abolition in 1871, he continued the tradition of shakuhachi playing as a spiritual practice.

The early 20th century saw a revival of the shakuhachi as a secular instrument for ensembles. Amateur shakuhachi flautists formed secular orchestras. Nishimura, however, played an antiquated shakuhachi with no plaster added to the bore. He also favoured long instruments. He decided to call this flute style kyotaku in order to differentiate it from the shorter, modern shakuhachi tuned to D minor pentatonic. The name kyotaku comes from the legend of the foundation of the Fuke sect described in Kyotaku denki kokuji kai.

Nishimura's son, Koryū, continued the study and teaching of kyotaku in Kumamoto.

Nishimura attained the rank of sixth dan in Okinawa karate, and of third dan in kendo. His other artistic pursuits included woodcarving and painting.

== Albums ==
- Fuke Shu Honkyoku; Kyorei
- Kyotaku (1998, remastered from a tape)

== See also ==
- Fuke-shū
- Buddhism in Japan
