= Kokutai-ji =

Buddhist temple in Toyama Prefecture, Japan

Coordinates: 36.811°N 137.011°E

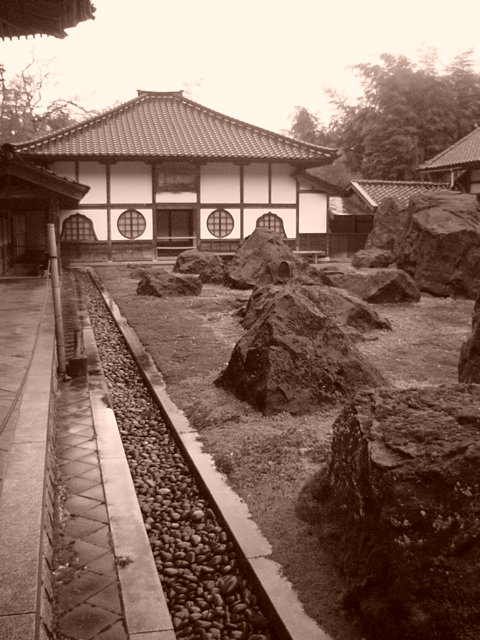
- Zendo at Kokutai-ji

Religion
- Affiliation: Rinzai

Location
- Location: 184 Ota, Takaoka-shi, Toyama-ken, 933-0133
- Country: Toyama, Japan
- Interactive map of Kokutai-ji

Architecture
- Founder: Jiun Myoi (a.k.a. Seisen Zenji)
- Completed: 1300

Kokutai-ji (国泰寺; "Temple of National Peace"), originally Tosho-ji (東松寺), is one of fourteen autonomous branches of the Rinzai school of Japanese Zen, founded in 1300 by the monk Jiun Myoi in Toyama, Japan. In 1327 Emperor Go-Daigo gave the temple the name Kokutai-ji, and Jiun Myoi became Seisen Zenji.

Kokutai-ji was once also a temple of the Fuke sect (as many Rinzai monasteries in Japan once were), and housed komusō. Rinzai monks and priests still dress and practice suizen as komusō during memorial ceremonies in remembrance of Jiun Myoi.

== See also ==
- Buddhism in Japan
