= Christopher Yohmei Blasdel =

Texan musician specializing in Japanese and Asian music

Christopher Yohmei Blasdel (クリストファー遙盟, born 1951 in Canyon, Texas) is a shakuhachi performer, researcher and writer specializing in the music of Japan and Asia. He studied under well known masters, holds a 5th-degree black belt in Aikido, and has made significant contributions to the promotion of Japanese music globally through performances, teaching, and publications in both English and Japanese. Blasdel's work has been recognized with awards, including the Sixth Rennyo Prize for Non-Fiction.

== History ==
In 1972, while on foreign study in Tokyo, Blasdel was introduced to the Kinko Style shakuhachi master (later designated "Living National Treasure") Goro Yamaguchi, whom he studied with until Yamaguchi’s death in 1999. In 1975, Blasdel began learning Aikido under Yasuo Kobayashi and performing with the butoh dancer Akira Kasai at his studio, Tenshikan. Blasdel presently holds a 5th degree black belt in Aikido.

In 1978, Blasdel entered the Musicology Faculty at Tokyo National University of Fine Arts (Geidai) with a scholarship from the Japanese government. He studied traditional Japanese and Asian music under the pioneering ethnomusicologist Fumio Koizumi and the Noh scholar Mario Yokomichi. He studied the ancient Myôan Style shakuhachi from Chikugai Okamoto and ensemble techniques from shamisen/koto master and Living National Treasure Kunie Fujii and gagaku ryûteki flute under Sukeyasu Shiba. Blasdel graduated from Geidai with a Master of Fine Arts in 1982. In 1984, he received his shihan master teaching license and professional name, Yohmei, from Yamaguchi—the first of only two non-Japanese ever accredited by Yamaguchi.

From 1988 until 2014, Blasdel worked at the International House of Japan as advisor to their arts program and curator of the Japan-US Friendship Commission Creative Artists’ Exchange Program. In 2005, he was promoted to Artistic Director of the International House. He taught Japanese music at International Christian University from 2001 to 2006 and at Temple University, Japan campus from 2002. He also taught as guest professor at Earlham College in 1988 and Chulalongkorn University in Bangkok in 1991. He is an adjunct lecturer in Japanese Music at the University of Hawaiʻi at Mānoa campus.

Together with Vlastislav Matousek, Blasdel helped to found the Prague Shakuhachi Festival. He also co-organized the Boulder World Shakuhachi Festival in 1998 and the World Shakuhachi Festival, Sydney in 2008. He was featured in the Sarawak Rainforest World Music Festival in 2004 and numerous other festivals and concert tours introducing Japanese music to the world. To date he has made a total of eight CDs of classical and contemporary shakuhachi music. He has added shakuhachi music to live readings of such distinguished poets as John Logan, Kenneth Rexroth, Sam Hamill, Makoto Ooka and Leza Lowitz.

His publications in English include The Shakuhachi, A Manual for Learning originally published in 1988 by Ongaku no Tomo-sha, the first book on shakuhachi technique and history in the English language published by a major publishing company (later re-written and published by Printed Matter Press in 2008). In 2006, Ongaku no Tomo-sha published the Japanese version of this manual. In 2005, Printed Matter Press published his semi-autobiographic account of his life in Japan The Single Tone, A Personal Journey into Shakuhachi Music. This book is now available on Amazon Kindle. In 2024 Blasdel's seminal work on the lyrics of jiuta sōkyoku songs, Jiuta Sōkyoku Lyrics and Explanations--Songs of the Floating World was published by Routledge Press.

His Japanese publications include Shakuhachi Odessei—Ten no Neiro ni Miserarete (「尺八オデッセイ—天の音色に魅せられて」Kawade Shobo Shinsha, 2000, translated and adapted into English as The Single Tone). This work was awarded the Sixth Rennyo Prize for Non Fiction in 1999.

== Discography ==
- Night of the Garuda 迦楼羅の夜、 Teichiku Records, Tokyo, 1986
- Voices from Afar, Voices from Within 遙なる笛、Teichiku Records, Tokyo, 1986
- Zen Reveries 禅問答、Moon Bridge, Portland, 1996
- Heart of Bamboo ハートオブバンブー、Copper Canyon Press, Port Townsend, Washington, 1999
- Bamboo Voice—Human Flute 竹の声、人の笛、Far East Records, Tokyo 2002
- Visionary Tones 浩々妙音、Bright One Records, Tokyo, 2005
- breathplay 息遊、2007
- NAVARASA A collaboration with acoustic bass player Mark Izu、2010
- Striking Light, Striking Dark A collaboration with vocalist Sasha Bogdanowitsch、2014
