= Atsuya Okuda =

Japanese-born musician

Atsuya Okuda (奥田 敦也 Okuda Atsuya) is a Japanese-born master player and teacher jinashi shakuhachi, an unrefined bamboo flute. Prior to dedicating his efforts to the bamboo flute, he was a professional jazz trumpet player from approximately 1965 until 1985.

== Biography ==
Since the death of Watazumi Doso in 1992, some regard Atsuya Okuda as the greatest living jinashi shakuhachi player. His style is very quiet and subtle and his patience has been described as "geological in dimension".

Okuda has taught shakuhachi since 1985 but until releasing The Sound of Zen in 2002, he refused to record his playing. He believed that only live sound leads to an understanding of jinashi shakuhachi. As of 2005, Atsuya Okuda lives and teaches in Kokubunji, a suburb of Tokyo.

== Album ==
- The Sound of Zen (2002)
- Bamboo Zen (2010)
- Plays Jinashi nobe Shakuhachi (2011)
- So-Zen (2013)
- Southern Island" - Tales of Palawan Island (2014)
- Tales of Bamboo (2014)
