= Ronnie Nyogetsu Reishin Seldin =

Tenrikyo-following Shakuhachi player

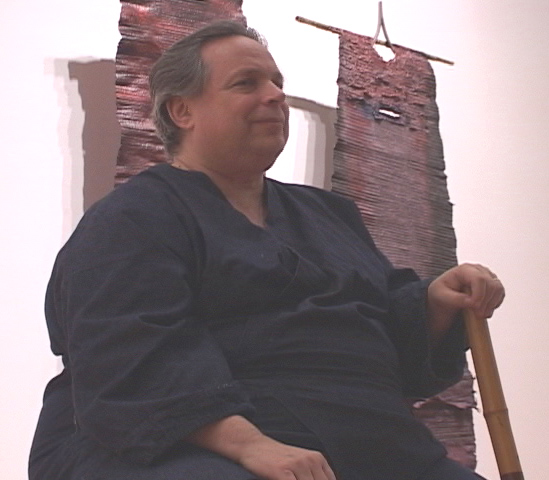
Ronnie Nyogetsu Reishin Seldin

Ronald Nyogetsu Reishin Seldin (Japanese: ラニー 如月 鈴心 セルディン, romanized: Ranī Nyogetsu Reishin Serudin July 3, 1947 – May 30, 2017) born in Brooklyn, New York, was a noted shakuhachi player.

Seldin studied theology at the New School for Social Research, then went to Japan where he studied the shakuhachi, receiving the name Nyogetsu in 1975. By 2001 he received his Grand Master's license at the level of Kyu-Dan and was given the name Reishin ("Heart/Mind of the Bell"). He performed on the soundtracks for A Family Gathering (1989), Civilization VI (2016) and also appeared on the Grammy Award-nominated "The Planet Sleeps."

He was of the Tenrikyo faith and lived with his wife Brenda in New York City. His wife is a practicing Chan Buddhist.

He was the founder and director of the Ki-Sui-An Shakuhachi Dojo, taught shakuhachi regularly in New York City, Philadelphia, Syracuse, and Boston, and led regular intensive shakuhachi retreats at Zen monasteries in upstate New York.
