= Hotchiku =

Musical instrument

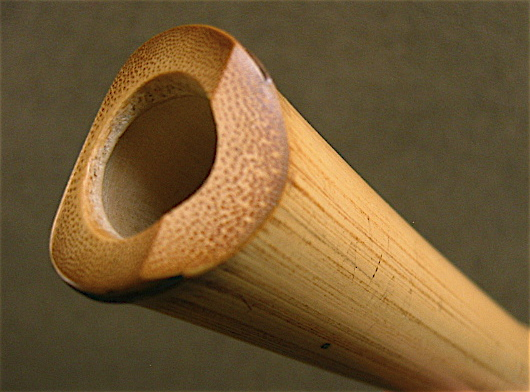
Natural utaguchi without inlay

The hotchiku (法竹(ほっちく), "bamboo of [the] dharma"; lit. 'dharma bamboo'), sometimes romanized as hocchiku or hochiku, is a Japanese aerophone, an end-blown bamboo flute, crafted from root sections of bamboo. The bamboo root is cleaned and sanded, resulting in a surface patterned with many small, circular knots where the roots formerly joined the stalk. The same part of the bamboo plant is also used to produce the shakuhachi but, unlike the shakuhachi, the hotchiku's inside (bore) and outside surfaces are left unlacquered, and an inlay is not used in the mouthpiece. The membranes at the nodes inside a hotchiku bore are generally left more intact than those of a shakuhachi, though older komuso shakuhachi also share this trait. Together, these characteristics make for a visibly and audibly raw and organic instrument. Hotchiku are sometimes referred to as jinashi nobekan, meaning "without ji [a paste made of clay and lacquer, used to smooth the bore on modern shakuhachi], one-piece"; hotchiku are not cut in two pieces for crafting or storage, unlike modern shakuhachi that are used as musical instruments.

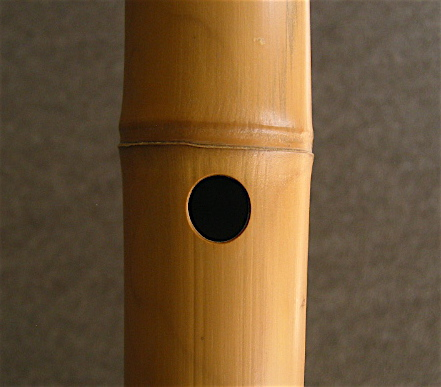
Finger hole

Hotchiku have four holes down the front for fingers and one hole on the back for the thumb of the upper hand. The instrument is capable of a range of at least two octaves, and more if the instrument is well-crafted and in the hands of an experienced player; they can be fashioned to any length, suitable bamboo permitting, with longer instruments having their frequency range shifted proportionally lower. Hotchiku are typically longer than other variations of the shakuhachi, and almost always thicker and heavier.

The techniques for playing the hotchiku are similar to shakuhachi techniques, although the sound resulting from hotchiku is more fragile and possibly less well tuned to musical scales than are modern, refined (ji-ari, or tuned ji-nashi) shakuhachi. The angle of the utaguchi (歌口, lit. 'singing mouth'), or blowing edge, of a hotchiku is closer to perpendicular to the bore axis than that of a modern shakuhachi, but this is mostly a choice of the maker depending upon the size of the bamboo. Older komuso and myoan shakuhachi also share this trait, though unlike hotchiku they usually have an inlaid blowing edge. This property, along with the unlacquered bore, results in a rough and breathy timbre.

Because of its extremely natural construction, the hotchiku is commonly used for suizen (吹禅) (blowing Zen meditation). Playing traditional honkyoku is generally only attempted by highly skilled shakuhachi musicians, since the blowing and fingering techniques required for honkyoku have to be altered considerably. Since hotchiku are not generally tuned to a standard musical scale, they do not commonly accompany other instruments.

== Distinctions between hotchiku and traditional komuso shakuhachi ==
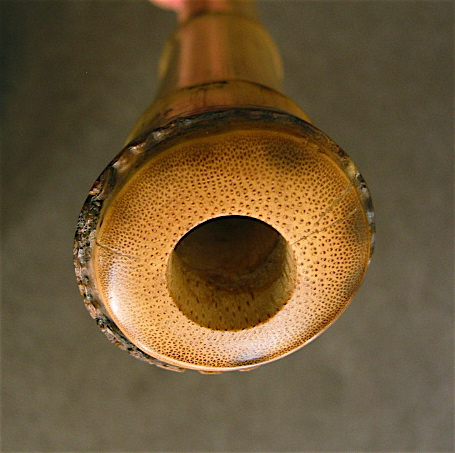
Natural bore, root end

The term hotchiku was popularized by Watzumi Doso. Traditional komuso shakuhachi were quite similar, with three primary differences. First, modern hotchiku performers such as Doso and Okuda often prefer exceptionally long shakuhachi, while komuso shakuhachi rarely exceeded 2.1 shaku. Second, komuso shakuhachi had an inlaid mouthpiece, which protects the blowing edge from taking on excess moisture and rotting out. Thirdly, though ji is not used, the inside is painted with urushi, a natural lacquer made from the sap of the urushi tree, used in Japan from antiquity. Like the mouthpiece inlay, this protects the bore from taking on excess moisture and contributes to the flute's longevity.

Lacking urushi and a mouthpiece inlay, hotchiku gradually take on moisture as they are played, making the tone less stable. Though komuso shakuhachi were not tuned to a precise scale either, they could generally be played together. As their hole positions were either calculated or copied from another shakuhachi, a particular honkyoku piece could be played roughly the same way on any shakuhachi. Hotchiku take even more freedom; some of Watazumi Doso's instruments were literally a piece of bamboo cut down with some holes seemingly randomly bored into it.

Distinguishing hotchiku from shakuhachi in general can be difficult, as there are many types of shakuhachi. In addition to komuso shakuhachi, there are also modern ji-nashi nobekan shakuhachi, such as those made by John Kaizan Neptune, which are tuned to be played with modern (Western) musical instruments. Again, since the abolition of the Fuke sect in 1871, modern shakuhachi have been made in two halves in order to tune them more precisely, but shakuhachi used for Zen practice have been primarily "nobekan" shakuhachi since the beginning. The term shakuhachi encompasses all of these, including komuso shakuhachi, and should not be understood as referring only to the modern, more musical iteration of the instrument.

== Famous hotchiku players ==
- Watazumi Doso Roshi
- Nishimura Koku
- Atsuya Okuda
