= Watazumi Doso =

Japanese musician

- Title: Roshi

Personal life
- Born: November 20, 1911 Fukuoka, Japan
- Died: December 14, 1992 (aged 81)

Religious life
- Religion: Buddhism
- School: Fuke

Watazumi Doso (海童道祖, わたづみ どうそ, Watazumi Dōso; わたづみ どうそ) Roshi (November 20, 1911 - December 14, 1992) was a master of the end-blown Japanese bamboo flute. He studied Rinzai Zen, attaining the title of rōshi (老師).

Born as Tanaka Masaru, he was also known as Tanaka Fumon, Itcho Fumon, Watazumi Fumon, and Watazumi Shuso.

Watazumi played unlacquered instruments that he referred to as hotchiku, in contrast with the modern shakuhachi, stressing that to truly understand nature and oneself, one had to use an instrument of the most raw and natural origin. From this grew what he called Watazumidō "Way of Watazumi".

In addition to hotchiku, Watazumi used the jō for exercise, invigoration, and training.

== Quotations ==
- "It's fine that you are all deep into music. But there's something deeper and if you would go deeper, if you go to the source of where the music is being made, you'll find something even more interesting. At the source, everyone's individual music is made. If you ask what the deep place is, it's your own life and it's knowing your own life, that own way that you live."
- "When you hear some music or hear some sound, if for some reason you like it very well; the reason is that sound is in balance or in harmony with your pulse. And so making a sound, you try to make various different sounds that imitate various different sounds of the universe, but what you are finally making is your own sound, the sound of yourself."
- "He who blows Ro 10 minutes every day can become a master."

== Works ==
- The Mysterious Sounds of the Japanese Bamboo Flute, Everest Records 3289
  - The Art of the Japanese Bamboo Flute. Album. Legacy International - CD 306. (Reissue of Everest 3289)
- Sokoinrancho. Album. Philips - PH-7503. 1970.
- Rinbo Yondai. Album. Philips - PH-7520. 1974.
- The Sacrifice. Film soundtrack. 1986.
- Sukiyaki and Chips: The Japanese Sounds of Music. Produced and directed by Jeremy Marre. A Harcourt Films production for Channel Four.

== See also ==
- Buddhism in Japan
- Katsuya Yokoyama, a famous student of Watazumi Doso
- Fuke-shū
- List of Rinzai Buddhists
- The Sacrifice, a Swedish film featuring the music of Watazumi Doso
