= Katsuya Yokoyama =

Japanese flautist

Katsuya YOKOYAMA
- Born: December 2, 1934; Shizuoka, Japan
- Died: April 21, 2010 (aged 75)
- Other name: 横山 勝也
- Occupation: Shakuhachi player

Katsuya Yokoyama (横山 勝也, Yokoyama Katsuya; 2 December 1934 – 21 April 2010) was a Japanese musician who played the shakuhachi, a traditional vertical bamboo flute.

== Early life ==
He was born in Shizuoka Prefecture in 1934 and studied Kinko-ryu and Azuma styles of music with his father, Rampo Yokoyama, and grandfather, Koson Yokoyama.

At the age of 25, Yokoyama began to study with Fukuda Rando, founder of the Azuma School and with Watazumi Doso, a legendary Fuke master who sought to synthesize shakuhachi music and spirituality within the context of Zen Buddhism. Guided by these two eminent masters, Yokoyama was able to combine the modernism of Rando with the deeply religious traditional spirit of Watazumido in his training. With this foundation, he came to develop a remarkably powerful and creative style that embodied both ends of the continuum. A descendant of the Kinko tradition transmitted down through the generations, he also pioneered a revolution in modern music that swept across post-War Japan.

== Career ==
In 1960, Yokoyama completed his studies at the NHK Japanese Traditional Music Training Center and, a year later, formed Shakuhachi San-Jyuso-dan, a trio devoted to furthering new music for the instrument. In 1963, he founded the Nihon Ongaku Shudan (Japanese Music Group) and Shakuhachi Sanbon-kai (Group of Three Shakuhachi) with Kinko master Aoki Reibo and Tozan master Hozan Yamamoto. The group helped to establish a new genre of music for the shakuhachi in trio.

Yokoyama achieved international attention for his New York City premiere performance in November 1967, of Tōru Takemitsu's composition November Steps, for shakuhachi, biwa, and orchestra, with the New York Philharmonic, under the direction of Seiji Ozawa (with biwa player Tsuruta Kinshi).

== Standing and honors ==
Up until his death Katsuya Yokoyama was head of the Chikushin-kai Shakuhachi Guild. He has been the recipient of many prestigious awards, amongst them the Geijutsu Sen-sho (Art Award) in 1971, the Geijutsu-sai Yushu-sho (Art Excellence Award) in 1972, the Geijutsu-sai Tai-sho (Art Festival Grand Prize) in 1973 given by the Agency for Cultural Affairs and the Ongaku no Tomo-sha Award in 1991.

In 1988, Yokoyama founded the Kokusai Shakuhachi Kenshu Center (International Shakuhachi Training Center) located in Bisei-cho, Okayama, Japan where he hosted the first International Shakuhachi Festival in 1993. This event precipitated founding of the World Shakuhachi Society and Festival held in Boulder, Colorado in 1998. At this gathering, five of the world's greatest shakuhachi masters, including Yokoyama, performed in a single venue for the first time ever.

In 2002, the Japanese government honored Katsuya Yokoyama for a lifetime of achievement by awarding him the esteemed Shiju Hosho (Purple Ribbon Medal) award.

== Death ==
Yokoyama died on April 21, 2010.
