= Komusō =

Wandering medicants recognized by their flute-playing

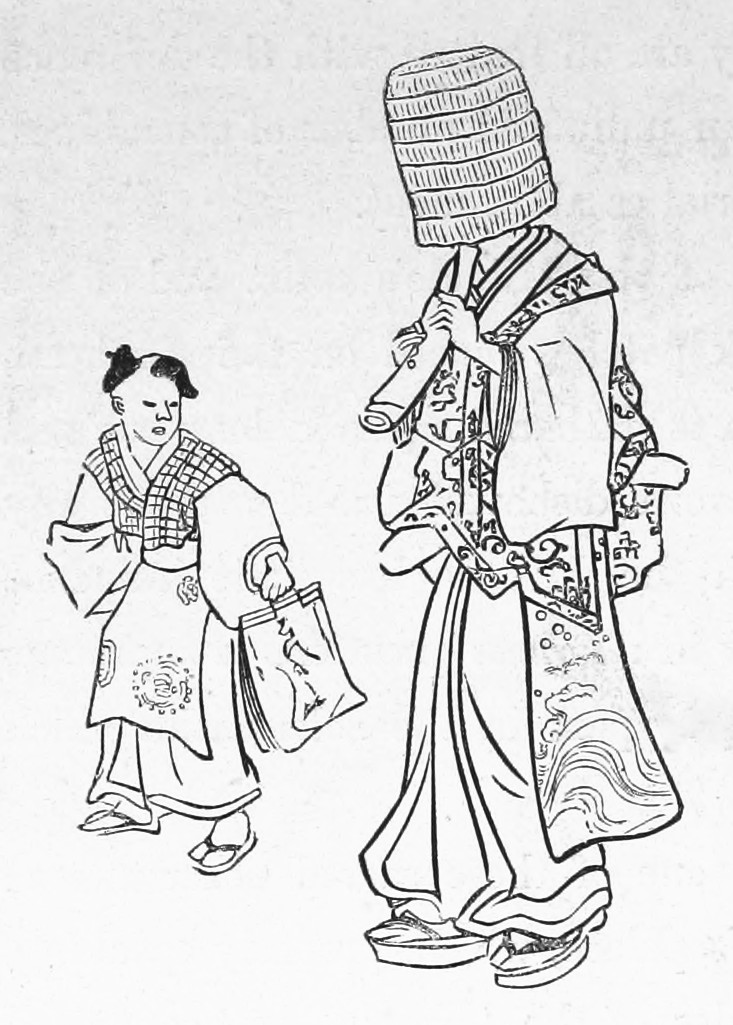
A komusō (monk of the Fuke sect) wearing a basket hat (天蓋, tengai/tengui) and playing the shakuhachi

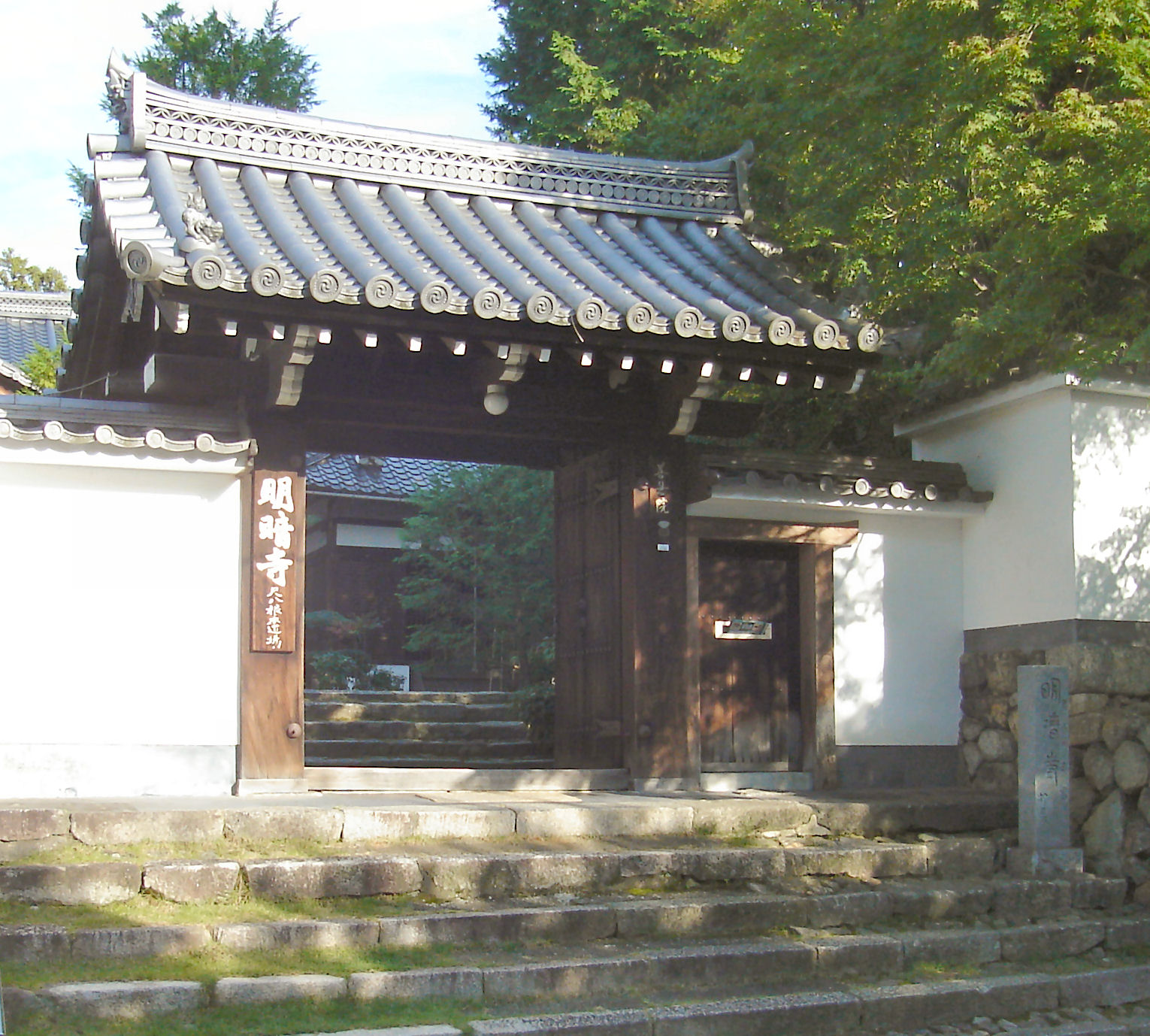
The entrance to Myōan-ji temple in Kyoto. Myōan-ji, a subsidiary of Tōfuku-ji, was the head temple of the Fuke sect, founded by the komusō Kyochiku Zenji.

The Komusō (虚無僧, 'priest of nothingness' or 'monk of emptiness') were wandering non-monastic lay Buddhists from the warrior-class (samurai and rōnin) who were noted for wearing straw basket hats called tengai and playing the shakuhachi bamboo flute, nowadays called suizen (吹禅, 'Zen of blowing (the flute)'). During the Edo period (1600–1868) they obtained various rights and privileges from the bakufu, the ruling elite.

The 18th and 19th century saw a popularization of shakuhachi-playing among lay-people, accompanied by the interpretation and legitimation of this laicization in spiritual and esthetical terms derived from the Zen-tradition, to which the komusō nominally belonged. In the 19th century the komusō tradition became known as the Fuke-shū (普化宗, Fuke sect) or Fuke Zen, after the publication of the Kyotaku denki (1795), which created a fictitious Rinzai Zen lineage starting with the eccentric Zen master Puhua (J. Fuke) of Tang China. This narrative legitimized the existence and rights of the komusō, but also ushered in the "bourgeoisization" of shakuhachi-playing in the 19th century.

The rights of the komusō were abolished in 1867, like other Buddhist organisations. Interest in their music style stayed alive in secular audiences, and a number of the pieces they composed and performed, called honkyoku, are preserved, played, and interpreted in the popular imagination as a token of Zen spirituality, continuing the narrative which developed in the 18th and 19th century.

== Etymology ==
Wandering musicians were known at first as komosō (薦僧, literally "straw-mat monks"). By the mid-17th century, different characters were used for the same pronunciation, resulting in komusō as Komusō (虚無僧) (also romanized komusou or komuso), "priest of nothingness" or "monk of emptiness". The first two characters, kyomu (虚無) (or komu) mean "nothingness, emptiness", with kyo (虚) (or ko) meaning "nothing, empty, false", and mu (無) meaning "nothing, without". The last character, sō (僧), means "priest, monk".

Fuke-shū (普化宗, Fuke sect), from Fuke (Chinese- Zhenzhou Puhua), an eccentric Zen master mentioned in the Record of Linji a Chinese Chan Buddhist and shū, meaning school or sect.

== History ==
The understanding of the history of the komusō and the Fuke-shu had long been dominated by the Keichô Okite Gaki (c. 1680) and the Kyotaku denki Kokuti Kai (1795), a forged Governmental Decree and a fictional origin-narrative, respectively. Historical research by Nakazuka Chikozan in the 1930s showed the spurious nature of these texts, and a revised history has emerged since then, as set out by Sanford (1977) and Kamisango (1988).

=== Boro and komosō (14th–16th century) ===
Predecessors of the komuso's were beggar-monks with unshaved heads known as boro's, boroboro or boronji, mentioned in the Tsurezurega (c. 1330). These boro merged in the late 15th century into the komosō ("straw-mat monks", named after the straw sleeping-mats which they carried along), which played the shakuhachi, and are depicted in paintings and texts from around 1500 onwards. The komosō came to be known as komusō. There is no evidence of any earlier tradition of shakuhachi-playing monks, and it is recorded that in 1518 the shakuhachi was regarded by some as an instrument for court music (gagaku), not for religious music.

The earliest komosō, predecessors of the later "priests of nothingness", were poor beggar monks without any social status in society. The later komusō, on the other hand, had to be of samurai family, even though the practice of teaching shakuhachi to townspeople had become very popular already in the early 18th century.

=== Institutionalization and privileges (17th century) ===
The komusō were initially a loose affiliation of monks and lay pilgrims, but solidified as an organized group in the 1600s. After the civil wars of the 15th–16th century, masterless samurai (rōnin) joined the komusō. Several uprisings involving rōnin took place during the first half of the 17th century, and the Tokugawa Shogunate tightened its control of the rōnin and komusō and other deviant groups, "extending authority through the Buddhist institutions". In response, the komusō "banded together and formed a sect", members of which, by their own regulations had to be of samurai descent. Due to the temperaments of the rōnin, the sect gained the reputation of harbouring troublemakers.

Simple lodges provided accommodation for the komoso, and the komoso lodge at Shirakata in Kyoto was chosen as its headquarters, calling it Myōan-ji. A temple was needed to be regarded as a religious sect, and Myōan-ji was recognized as a temple in the early 17th century, at the beginning of the Edo period. While first a subtemple of Reiho-ji, in the 18th century a relation with Kōkoku-ji, founded by Kakushin, was forged, and officially acknowledged in 1767; a move which was apologized in the Kuotaku Denki. At the request of the government, the headquarters of the komusō were transferred to two temples in Edo, where they could better be controlled. A directive from the government from 1677 marks this recognition, and control over, the komusō, as a distinct institution.

The purportedly oldest document granting privileges to the komusō is the Keichō Okite Gaki (Governmental Decree of the Keichô Years, 1596–1615), a falsified decree signed 1614 but actually dated to around 1680, intended to lend legitimacy to already existing komusō-practices. Presented with this forgery, the shogunate eventually accepted it, to provide refuge to ronin and gain control over them.

Several versions of this document exist, which can be divided in short and long versions, reflecting the power-struggle between the komusō and the government. The short versions show that the government designated the institutionalisation for the lodging of ronin, limiting and policing the komusō, and instructing them to act as spies.

Travel around Japan was heavily restricted in the Edo period, but the longer versions gave the komusō a rare exemption from the Tokugawa shogunate, most likely for political reasons. To be given a free pass in these times was a highly unusual and very special exemption from travel restrictions, and rumors from the period held that in return for this privilege the komusō had to report back to the central government about conditions in the provinces, a practice which helped seal the group's demise when the government itself fell. The authenticity of this decree was in doubt, despite it being treated as legitimate and amended by future leaders within the shogunate.

In the longer versions, komuso's were also given exclusive right to play the instrument during the Edo period by the Bakufu as a way to identify them, a provision missing from the shorter versions. They were not recognized as a legal monastic entity beyond these token exemptions by the shogunate, and were not eligible to participate in the Danka system.

While there were over 120 komuso-associated "temple-lodges", early 17th century, their number decreased, as membership of the komuso was strictly restricted to the samurai.

=== Oldest documented honkyoku (1664) ===
The oldest documentation of any named honkyoku piece is in the Shichiku shoshin-shū (Collection of Pieces for beginners on Strings and Bamboo, 1664). This text mentions Kyō Renbo, Goro, Yoshino and other pieces, but it does not mention any of the pieces considered to be the "three classics" (Mukaiji/Mukaiji reibo, Kokū/Kokū Reibo, Kyorei/Shin no Kyorei).

=== The Kyotaku denki and the Fuke-shū (18th–19th century) ===
The name Fuke-shū does not appear before the 19th century, and the sect has never been officially acknowledged as a distinct Zen-school. The name is derived from the Kyotaku denki, a text in classical Chinese that was published in 1795 together with a Japanese translation and commentary, the Kokuji Kai, "to create a legitimate affiliation between the komusō and the Rinzai-shu." It was published at a time when the komusō faced difficulties and started to lose privileges, and its publication may have been an attempt to strengthen their position. The legend itself seems to be older, already mentioned in the Boro-no Techô (1628) and the Shichiku Shoshin-shû (1664).

The Kyotaku denki pictured a lineage back to the eccentric Zen master Puhua (J. Fuke) of Tang China, a clown-esque figure from the Record of Linji. According to legend, Puhua roamed the streets ringing a bell while preaching. A man named Zhang Bai asked to become Puhua's student, but was rejected. He then made an instrument of bamboo to imitate the bell.

According to the Kyotaku denki, Fuke Zen was brought to Japan by Shinchi Kakushin (心地覚心) (1207–1298), also known as Muhon Kakushin (無本覺心) and posthumously as Hotto Kokushi (法燈國師). Kakushin had travelled in China for six years and studied with the famous Chinese Chan master Wumen (無門) of the Linji lineage. Kakushin became a disciple of the lay-teacher Chôsan, who claimed to be a 16th generation dharma-heir of Puhua.

Yet, no mention is made in Kakushin's diaries of the shakuhachi, and the four "disciples" who purportedly returned with him to Japan were just servants. No Fuke-school is known from China, and the Fuke-shū seems to have been a Japanese creation. Typically, its "members" had no doctrines or scriptures, nor any parishioners, and Fuke-adherents rarely chanted sutras or other Buddhist texts.

=== Codification, laicization, spiritualization and decline (18th–19th century) ===
Initially, membership was restricted to the samurai, but after the mid-18th century restrictions watered down, and non-samurai who could pay the entrance fee were also admitted. Discipline laxed, and members joined who were only attracted by the privileges of the komuso. By the late 18th-century, the komuso had lost their usefulness as spies, due to the peaceful life-circumstances created by the Tokugawa shogunate, which no longer tolerated their privileges. Playing the shakuhachi lost its distinguishing feature, as lay-people from the richer classes learned to play the instrument, a development accompanied by the development of a Zen-derived spiritual narrative, building on the Zen-narrative of the komuso.

==== Kurosawa Kinko (1710–1771) ====
Historically, approximately forty komuso temples across Japan nurtured their unique collections of Honkyoku. In the 18th century, the master Kurosawa Kinko (1710–1771), the founder of the Kinko-ryu, embarked on a journey to these temples, seeking out local compositions. He meticulously 'arranged' or 'composed' over 30 pieces, shaping the cornerstone of the Kinko school's Honkyoku repertoire today. According to Deeg, "the systematisation of certainly already existing elements legitimising Fuke-shu in the Denki, probably originated in the proto-organisation of the Kinko-ryu which was itself starting towards the end of the 18th century. This proto-organisation, with its legend and related musical tradition, consolidated the Fuke-shu as a Zen denomination in its own right."

Kinko's influence extended beyond musical creation; he played a pivotal role in introducing Fuke shakuhachi teachings to lay practitioners, fostering the ascent of Fuke shakuhachi in the Japanese cultural landscape while supplanting its precursor, the hitoyogiri shakuhachi. Kinko was also instrumental in the spiritualization of the shakuhachi.

==== Hisamatsu Masagoro Fuyo (1790–1845) ====
Deeg notes that in the 19th century there was a process of laicization, spiritualization and aesthetization of the distinguishing feature of the komuso, the playing of the shakuhachi. According to Deeg, "The only extant writing which really has Zen-inspired content was composed by Hisamatsu Masagoro Fuyo (1790–1845)", namely Hitori-gotoba (獨言, "Monologue", before 1830), Hitori-mondo (獨問答, "Monologous dialogues", 1823) and Kaisei-hogo (海靜法語, "Dharma-words of the silent sea", 1838). Hisamatsu Fuyo frequently uses expressions like ichion jobutsu (一音成仏(佛), "to achieve enlightenment by one sound", chikuzen ichinyo (竹禅一如), and "bamboo [the shakuhachi] and Zen are one and the same"; the shakuhachi is called hoki (法器), "instrument of the dharma". (Note: According to Robin Hartshorne and Kazuaki Tanahashi, Hitori Mondō ("Self-questioning") bears a similarity to suizen: "Here, he speaks of 'going all the way with intellect and then going beyond intellect' on the path to enlightenment. He distinguishes the form (jitsu) of shakuhachi music played for entertainment from the emptiness (kyo) of Zen instrumental practice.")

Nevertheless, according to Deeg, "Hisamatsu’s texts contain amazingly few "Zenist" expressions and instead focus on the actual practice of the playing of the instrument." According to Deeg, Hisamatsu's "spiritualisation and aesthetization" has to be understood in the context of the laicization of shakuhachi-practice, with all the teachers of the Kinko-ryu, who were not fully ordained komuso but shuen josui, "assistant flutists related to the (Fuke-)shu", mainly training lay-people. Deeg concludes that the spiritalization is not a development from within the kosumo, but "a strategy of legitimation for a more and more bourgeois musical tradition of the late Tokugawa-period", harking back to an (imagined) glorious Zen-past. According to Deeg, the Denki served also as a legitimation of this laicization, or "bourgeoisization", which explains why householders have such a prominent place in its fabricated lineage.

==== Abolishment (1871) ====
The Tokugawa government revoked all formal privileges for the komusō in 1847.

In 1871, after the fall of the Tokugawa Shogunate and the start of the Meiji Restoration, the komusō ceased to exist as a semi-religious institution. It was prohibited by the Meiji-administration during its persecution of Buddhist institutions. The Meiji government attempted to continue the Danka system, but the komusō were outlawed as they were not a part of this system. Practice of the shakuhachi was banned entirely for four years by the Meiji government, after which it was decreed that secular playing was permitted, and practitioners went on to teach the shakuhachi as a secular instrument. No attempts were made by the Buddhist mainstream to re-establish the sect, possibly due to its marginal position and the loose connection to the Rinzai-shu, and the laicization of shakuhachi-practice.

=== Secular popularisation (19th–20th century) ===
==== Survival of the shakuhachi-tradition ====
The Kinko Ryu Grandmasters Araki Kodo II (Chikuo I) and Yoshida Ittcho successfully petitioned the new government to allow secular shakuhachi music to continue. Practice of the shakuhachi survived thanks to these efforts, and documentation of the musical repertoire of the performers survived through the period.

==== Present-day schools ====
Several smaller schools persisted, often stemming from local Fuke temples preserving fragments of the original repertoire, and small associations and organizations work to continue this musical tradition in the modern era. Notable Honkyoku schools are:

School	Founder
Chikuho Ryū	Sakai Chikuho I 初世酒井 竹保
Chikushinkai (Dokyoku)	Watazumi Doso 海童道祖 / Yokoyama Katsuya 横山 勝也
Jikishō Ryū	Tajima Tadashi 田嶋直士
Mu Ryû	Miyata Kohachiro 宮田耕八朗
Myoan Shinpo Ryū	Ozaki Shinryu 尾崎真龍
Nezasa Ha / Kimpu Ryū	Kurihara (Einosuke) Kinpu 栗原錦風
Seien Ryū	Kanemoto Seien 兼友西園
Taizan Ha	Higuchi Taizan 樋口対山
Tozan Ryū	Nakao Tozan 中尾都山
Ueda Ryū	Ueda Hodo 上田芳憧

The major schools of shakuhachi music that survive to today come from two guilds: the Meian and Kinko. These guilds are a synthesis of two sects of an earlier Fuke-shū guild of komusō priests.

The Myoan Kyokai stands as a significant bastion of this tradition, but lack organizational unity.

The contemporary Kyochiku Zenji Hosan Kai (KZHK) group in Kyoto organizes annual meetings for hundreds of shakuhachi players, Rinzai clerics, and Fuke Zen enthusiasts. The related Myōan Society, as well as other small groups throughout Japan. KZHK and the Myōan Society operate from their base temples of Tōfuku-ji and Myōan-ji, the latter being the former headquarters of the Fuke sect. Many Rinzai monks still practice as komusō during certain celebrations in former Fuke-shū temples that have, since the 19th century, reverted to traditional Rinzai Zen. Notable temples include Kokutai-ji and Ichigatsu-ji.

Hakata Ward holds one of remaining temples where Komusō continue to perform.

Members of the general public can learn to play the shakuhachi at the dojo at Icchoken in Hakata-ku, and players who learn all 60 songs of the tradition can be certified as shakuhachi masters.

==== Contemporary komusō ====
At least several particular individuals in modern times have been known to pursue temporary itinerant lifestyles as komusō, for spiritual or learning purposes. Hõzan Murata, a famous shakuhachi player, maker, and dai-shihan (grandmaster), lived as a komusō for 8 months in 1974. Perhaps the most well-known contemporary komusō are Kokū Nishimura—who famously carried on the tradition of dubbing shakuhachi kyotaku ("empty bell"), in reference to the legend of Puhua (Fuke)—and Watazumi Doso, known for his innovations with and revitalization of the shakuhachi repertoire, and the popularization of the hotchiku.

== Characteristics of the komusō ==
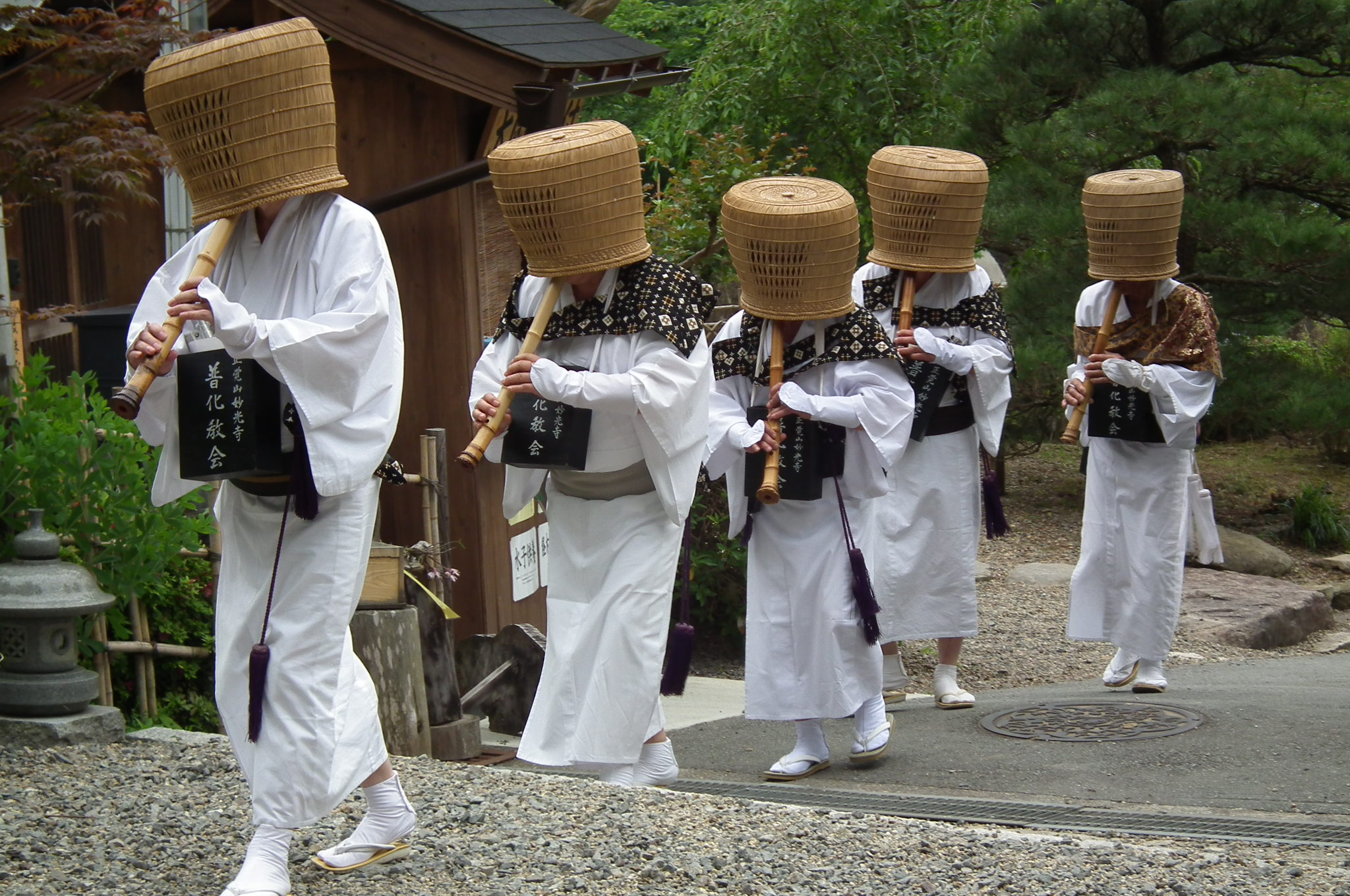
Komusō

The komusō were characterized in the public imagination of Japan by their playing of solo pieces, honkyoku ("fundamental pieces"), on the shakuhachi (a type of bamboo flute), a practice known today as suizen, while wearing a large woven basket hat or tengai (天蓋) that covered their entire head as they went on pilgrimage.

=== Flute ===
The shakuhachi flute derives its name from its size. Shaku is an old unit of measure close to 1 foot (30 cm). Hachi means eight, which in this case represents a measure of eight-tenths of a shaku. True shakuhachi are made of bamboo and can be very expensive.

=== Suizen ===
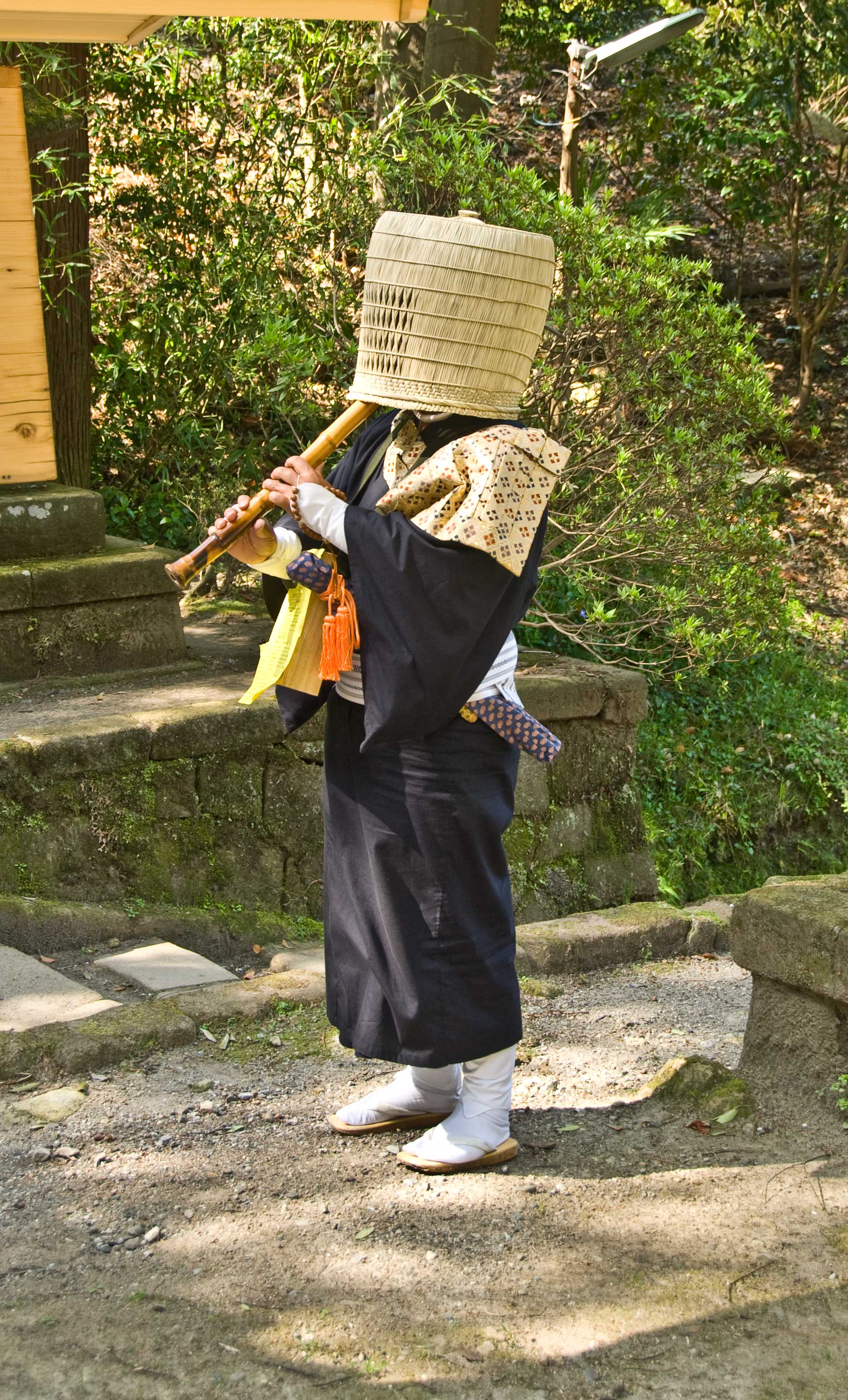
A Buddhist monk begging as a komusō

The playing of honkyoku on the shakuhachi in return for alms is known today as suizen ('Zen of blowing (the flute)'), and interpreted as a form of dhyana, "meditation").

According to Deeg, the image of "shakuhachi-Zen" as a spiritual practice is reinforced by western shakuhachi-players, giving it spiritual connotations it never had in Japan. According to Deeg, this spiritualisation "can be comprehended with the aid of two concepts, those of "attaining buddhahood through one sound" (ichion-jōbutsu 一音 成佛) and "the Zen of blowing (the flute)" (suizen 吹禪). (Note: Deeg) refers to "the content of the two published volumes of the Annals of the International Shakuhachi Society (ISS)" as an example. For example:

- According to Blasdel, the concept of ichi on jōbutsu – the attainment of enlightenment through a single note (Note: Or 'the expression of awakening in a single note') – became an important aspect of the Fuke sect's ‘blowing Zen’ as it developed in later periods.
- According to Christopher Yohmei Blasdel, the shakuhachi was used as a hoki (religious tool) "to enter the realm of enlightenment".
- According to Ralph Samuelson, for suizen practitioners honkyoku pieces are traditionally played in the manner of a personal spiritual practice and not as a public performance.

=== Disguise and outfit ===
The komusō (虚無僧/こむそう) were characterized by a straw basket (a sedge or reed hood known as a tengai) worn on the head, manifesting the absence of specific ego but also useful for traveling incognito.

Komusō wore a tengai (天蓋), a type of woven straw hat or kasa, which completely covered their head like an overturned basket. The idea was that the wearing of such a hat removed the ego of the wearer, whilst also concealing their identity. Further, the government granted the komusō the rare privilege to freely travel the country without hindrance; one reason doing so may have been an interest on behalf of the shogunate to receive first-hand information about conditions in the provinces, the collection of such information made possible by the concealed nature of the komusō.

Komusō wore kimono – especially of a five-crested, formal mon-tsuki style – and obi, as well as an o-kuwara, a rakusu-like garment worn over the shoulders. Komusō would wear a secondary shakuhachi to accompany their primary flute, possibly as a replacement for the samurai's wakizashi; their primary shakuhachi, usually a 1.8 size instrument (I shaku ha sun), would be pitched in rough equivalence to the D or D flat in the twelve-tone scale.

Komusō wore inro from their belt – a container for medicine, tobacco and other items – kyahan shin coverings above their tabi socks and waraji sandals, and a hachimaki headband, covered by the tengai. They wore tekou, hand-and-forearm covers, a fusa tassel, and carried a gebako, a box used for collecting alms and holding documents.

== Honkyoku ==
Honkyoku (本曲, "original pieces") comprises a repertoire of solo compositions for the shakuhachi. The pieces, except for the very latest ones, were initially cultivated for the solicitation of alms by solitary wandering mendicants.

=== Kinko Ryū Repertory ===
Shika no Tōne
A honkyoku piece recorded by Araki Kodō III

The following Honkyoku make up what is now known as the Kinko Ryu Shakuhachi Honkyoku Repertoire, the pieces played by the Kinko school:

1. Hifumi—Hachigaeshi no Shirabe 一二三鉢返の調
2. Taki-ochi no Kyoku (Taki-otoshi no Kyoku) 瀧落の曲
3. Akita Sugagaki 秋田菅垣
4. Koro Sugagaki 転菅垣
5. Kyūshū Reibo 九州鈴慕
6. Shizu no Kyoku 志図の曲
7. Kyō Reibo 京鈴慕
8. Mukaiji Reibo 霧海箎
9. Kokū Reibo 虚空
10. a) Kokū Kaete (Ikkan-ryū) 虚空替手 (一関流) b) Banshikichō 盤渉調
11. Shin Kyorei 真虚霊
12. Kinsan Kyorei 琴三虚霊
13. Yoshiya Reibo 吉野鈴慕
14. Yūgure no Kyoku 夕暮の曲
15. Sakai Jishi 栄獅子
16. Uchikae Kyorei 打替虚霊
17. Igusa Reibo 葦草鈴慕
18. Izu Reibo 伊豆鈴慕
19. Reibo Nagashi 鈴慕流
20. Sōkaku Reibo 巣鶴鈴慕
21. Sanya Sugagaki 三谷菅垣
22. Shimotsuke Kyorei 下野虚霊
23. Meguro-jishi 目黒獅子
24. Ginryū Kokū 吟龍虚空
25. Sayama Sugagaki 佐山菅垣
26. Sagari Ha no Kyoku 下り葉の曲
27. Namima Reibo 波間鈴慕
28. Shika no Tōne 鹿の遠音
29. Hōshōsu 鳳将雛
30. Akebono no Shirabe 曙の調
31. Akebono Sugagaki 曙菅垣
32. Ashi no Shirabe 芦の調
33. Kotoji no Kyoku 琴柱の曲
34. Kinuta Sugomori 砧巣籠
35. Tsuki no Kyoku 月の曲
36. Kotobuki no Shirabe 寿の調

At least three additional pieces were later added to the Kinko-Ryu repertoire:

1. Kumoi Jishi 雲井獅子
2. Azuma no Kyoku 吾妻の曲
3. Sugagaki 菅垣

The earliest list of the repertoire is dated to the first half of the 18th century, and the compositions do not contain direct references to the terminology of the Kyotaku denki, which is an indication that the incorporation of Zen philosophy, or "shakuhachi-Zen", is a 19th-century phenomenon.

=== Complete recordings ===
Recordings of the complete honkyoku of the Kinko School have been recorded by

- Araki Kodo V (Chikuo II)
- Aoki Reibo II
- Yamaguchi Goro

== See also ==
- Puhua
- Shakuhachi
- Hotchiku
- Zen
  - Rinzai
  - Ōbaku

== Sources ==
- Baroni, Helen J. (2002). The Illustrated Encyclopedia of Zen Buddhism. The Rosen Publishing Group.
- Buswell; Lopes (2014). "Fukeshu". Princeton Dictionary of Buddhism. Princeton University Press.
- Deeg, Max (2007). "Komusō and "Shakuhachi-Zen": From Historical Legitimation to the Spiritualisation of a Buddhist denomination in the Edo Period" (PDF). Japanese Religions. 32 (1–2): 7–38. Archived from the original (PDF) on 2013-04-08.
- Ferguson, Andy. Zen's Chinese Heritage: The Masters and Their Teachings. Wisdom Publications, Boston, 2000. ISBN 0-86171-163-7
- Hughes, David W. (2017-02-03). The Ashgate Research Companion to Japanese Music. Routledge. ISBN 978-1-351-69760-6.
- Kamisango, Yuko (1988). "The Shakuhachi. History and Development". Komuso. Translated by Christopher Yomei Blasdel.
- Linder, Gunnar Jinmei (2012). Deconstructing Traditional Japanese Music: A Study on Shakuhachi, Historical Authenticity and Transmission of Tradition (PhD Dissertation). Stockholm University.
- Linder, Gunnar Jinmei (2017). "Analysis of Transmission in Japanese Traditional Art Forms: Part 2, A Comprehensive study of Shakuhachi Lineages". Journal of East Asian Identities. 2: 117–127.
- Mau, Christian (2014). Situating the Myōan Kyōkai: A Study of Suizen and the Fuke Shakuhachi (PhD thesis). University of London.
- Mau, C.T. (2018). "Gathering to Study: the Case of the Myoan Shakuhachi's Benkyo-kai". Community Music in Oceania: Many Voices, One Horizon. University of Hawai' Press.
- Pope, Edgar W. (2000). "The Shakuhachi, the Fuke-shu, and the Scholars: a Historical Controversy". Journal of Hokusei Jr. Col. 36: 31–44.
- Watson, Burton; tr. The Zen Teachings of Master Lin-Chi: A Translation of the Lin-chi lu. New York: Columbia University Press, 1999. ISBN 0-231-11485-0.
- Sanford, James H. (1977). "Shakuhachi Zen. The Fuke-shu and Komuso". Monumenta Nipponica. 32 (4): 411–440. doi:10.2307/2384045. JSTOR 2384045.
- Shin Meikai kokugo jiten (新明解国語辞典), Sanseido Co., Ltd., Tokyo 1974
