= Shakuhachi =

Japanese end-blown flute

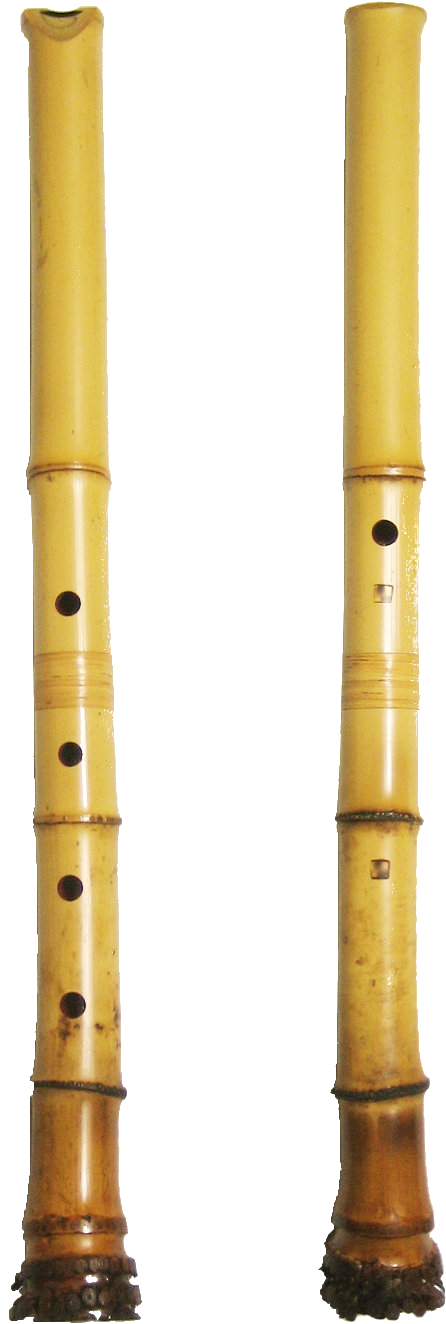
- A Tozan school shakuhachi flute, blowing edge up. Left: top view, four holes. Right: bottom view, fifth hole.

Woodwind instrument
- Classification: Woodwind
- Hornbostel–Sachs classification: 421.111.12 (Open single end-blown flute with fingerholes)
- Developed: 7th or 8th century (kodai shakuhachi or ancient shakuhachi); 16th century (fuke shakuhachi, the currently known shakuhachi)

A shakuhachi (Japanese: 尺八; pronounced [ɕakɯhat͡ɕi]) is a Japanese longitudinal, end-blown flute that is made of bamboo. The bamboo end-blown flute now known as the shakuhachi was developed in Japan in the 16th century and is called the fuke shakuhachi (普化尺八). A bamboo flute known as the kodai shakuhachi (古代尺八, ancient shakuhachi) or gagaku shakuhachi (雅楽尺八) was derived from the Chinese xiao in the Nara period and died out in the 10th century. After a long blank period, the hitoyogiri shakuhachi (一節切尺八) appeared in the 15th century, and then in the 16th century, the fuke shakuhachi was developed in Japan. The fuke shakuhachi flourished in the 18th century during the Edo period, and eventually the hitoyogiri shakuhachi also died out. The fuke shakuhachi developed in Japan is longer and thicker than the kodai shakuhachi and has one finger hole less. It is longer and thicker than hitoyogiri shakuhachi and is superior in volume, range, scale and tone quality. Today, since the shakuhachi generally refers only to fuke shakuhachi, the theory that the shakuhachi is an instrument unique to Japan is widely accepted.

The shakuhachi is traditionally made of bamboo, but versions now exist in ABS, ebonite, anodized aluminum, and hardwoods. It was used by the monks of the Fuke Zen of Zen Buddhism in the practice of suizen (blowing meditation).

The instrument is tuned to the minor pentatonic scale.

== Etymology ==
The name shakuhachi means "1.8 shaku", referring to its size. It is a compound of two words:

1. shaku (尺) is an archaic unit of length equal to 30.3 centimetres (0.99 ft) and subdivided in ten subunits.
2. hachi (八) means "eight", here eight sun, or tenths, of a shaku.

Thus, the compound word shaku-hachi means "one shaku eight sun" (54.54 cm (21.47 in)), the standard length of a shakuhachi. Other shakuhachi vary in length from about 1.1 shaku up to 3.6 shaku. Although the sizes differ, all are still referred to generically as shakuhachi.

== Overview ==
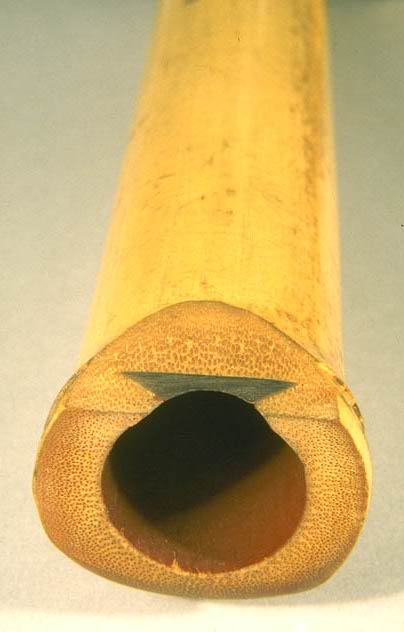
A shakuhachi showing its Kinko school utaguchi (歌口, blowing edge) and inlay

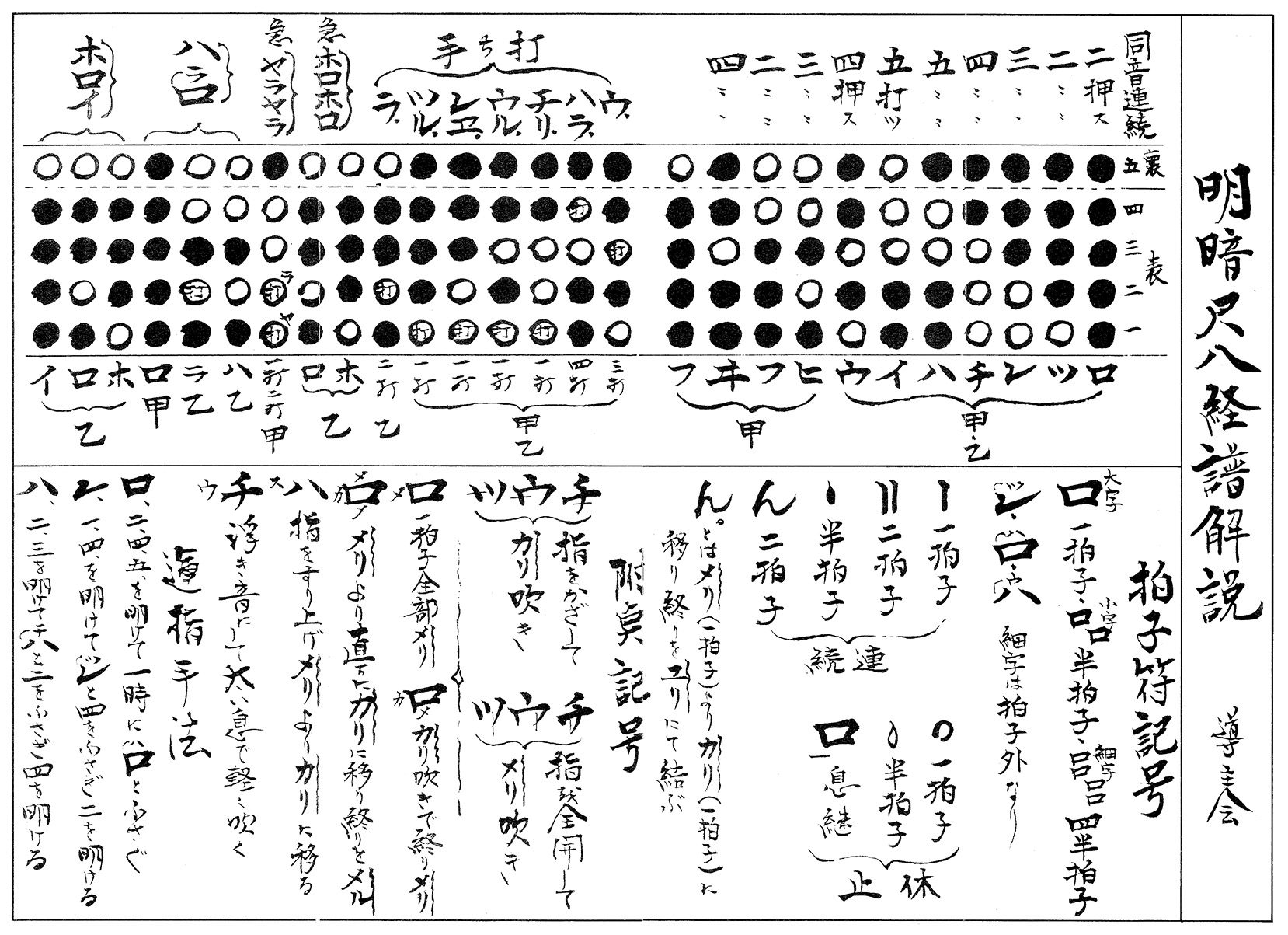
Myōan-ji shakuhachi fingering chart and notation

Shakuhachi are usually made from the root end of madake (Phyllostachys bambusoides) bamboo culm and are extremely versatile instruments. Professional players can produce virtually any pitch they wish from the instrument, and play a wide repertoire of original Zen music, ensemble music with koto, biwa, and shamisen, folk music, jazz, and other modern pieces.

Much of the shakuhachi's subtlety (and player's skill) lies in its rich tone colouring, and the ability for its variation. Different fingerings, embouchures and amounts of meri/kari can produce notes of the same pitch, but with subtle or dramatic differences in the tone colouring. Holes can be covered partially and pitch varied subtly or substantially by changing the blowing angle. The Honkyoku pieces rely heavily on this aspect of the instrument to enhance their subtlety and depth.

Unlike a recorder, where the player blows into a duct—a narrow airway over a block which is called a "fipple"—and thus has limited pitch control, the shakuhachi player blows as one would blow across the top of an empty bottle (though the shakuhachi has a sharp edge to blow against called utaguchi) and therefore has substantial pitch control. The term utaguchi (歌口) literally translates as "to the mouth that sings", referring to the upper and main hole of the flute where the mouthpiece or blowing edge is created by a natural diagonal cut in the bamboo.

The history of the shakuhachi shows a variety of designs of inlaid mouthpieces that vary between certain traditional Japanese schools of shakuhachi. Thus, the Kinko Ryu, Myoan and Tozan Ryu, differ in different features in their line of mouthpiece design, coinciding in them the total non-use in their inlay of the semi-circumference formed by the natural cut of the mouthpiece in the bamboo. Beyond the fact that these inlaid forms were a hallmark of styles and schools, the fact of inlaying a mouthpiece historically could respond to a way of repairing the instrument due to wear or damage in particular in its blowing edge.

The five finger holes are tuned to a minor pentatonic scale with no half-tones, but using techniques called meri (メリ) and kari (カリ), in which the blowing angle is adjusted to bend the pitch downward and upward, respectively, combined with embouchure adjustments and fingering techniques the player can bend each pitch as much as a whole tone or more. Pitches may also be lowered by shading (カザシ, kazashi) or partially covering finger holes. Since most pitches can be achieved via several different fingering or blowing techniques on the shakuhachi, the timbre of each possibility is taken into account when composing or playing thus different names are used to write notes of the same pitch which differ in timbre. The shakuhachi has a range of two full octaves (the lower is called 乙/呂 otsu, the upper, 甲 kan) and a partial third octave (大甲 dai-kan) though experienced players can produce notes up to E7 (2637.02 Hz) on a 1.8 shakuhachi. The various octaves are produced using subtle variations of breath, finger positions and embouchure.

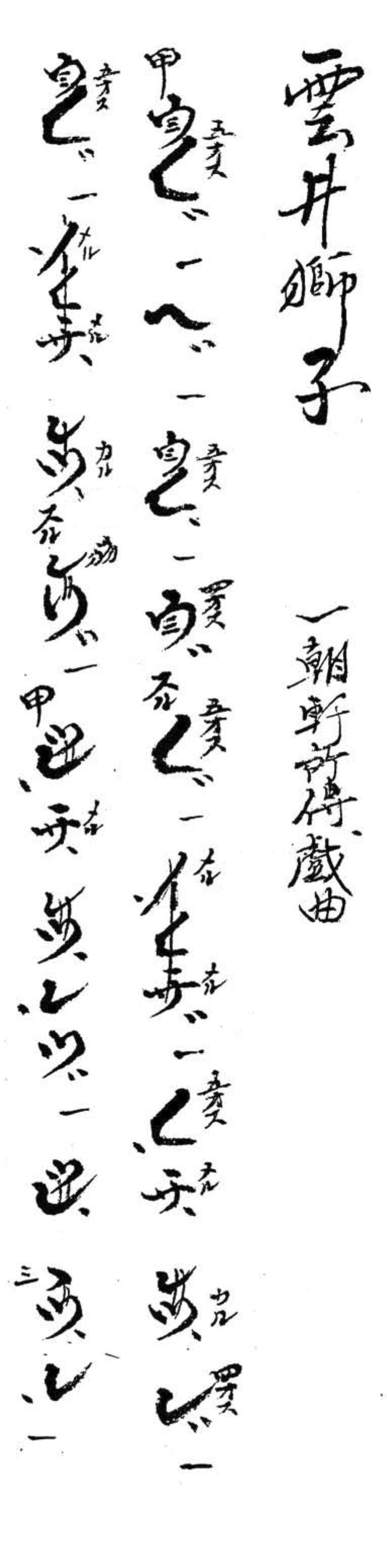
Honkyoku notation example; first two lines of Kumoijishi (雲井獅子).

In traditional shakuhachi repertoire, instead of tonguing for articulation like many Western wind instruments, hitting holes (oshi (押し), osu (オス)) with a very fast movement is used and each note has its corresponding repeat fingerings; e.g., for repeating C5 the 5th hole (D5's tone hole) is used.

A 1.8 shakuhachi produces D4 (D above Middle C, 293.66 Hz) as its fundamental—the lowest note it produces with all five finger holes covered, and a normal blowing angle. In contrast, a 2.4 shakuhachi has a fundamental of A3 (A below Middle C, 220 Hz). As the length increases, the spacing of the finger holes also increases, stretching both fingers and technique. Longer flutes often have offset finger holes, and very long flutes are almost always custom made to suit individual players. Some honkyoku, in particular those of the Nezasaha (Kimpu-ryū) school, are intended to be played on these longer flutes.

Due to the skill required, the time involved, and the range of quality in materials to craft bamboo shakuhachi, one can expect to pay from US$1,000 to US$8,000 for a new or used flute. Because each piece of bamboo is unique, shakuhachi cannot be mass-produced, and craftsmen must spend much time finding the correct shape and length of bamboo, curing it for more or less of a decade in a controlled environment and then start shaping the bore for almost a year using Ji (地) paste—many layers of a mixture including tonoko powder (砥の粉) and seshime and finished with urushi lacquer—for each individual flute to achieve correct pitch and tonality over all notes. Specimens of extremely high quality, with valuable inlays, or of historical significance can fetch US$20,000 or more. Plastic or PVC shakuhachi have some advantages over their traditional bamboo counterparts: they are lightweight, extremely durable, nearly impervious to heat and cold, and typically cost less than US$100. Shakuhachi made of wood are also available, typically costing less than bamboo but more than synthetic materials. Nearly all players, however, prefer bamboo, citing tonal qualities, aesthetics, and tradition.

== History ==
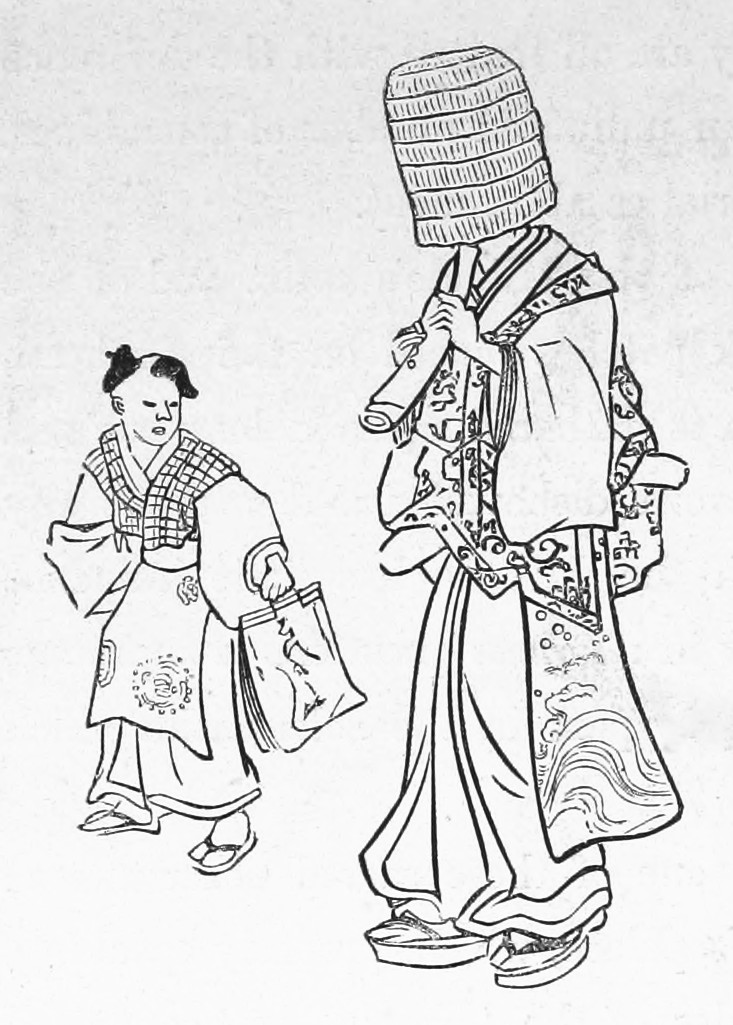
Sketch of a komusō (right) playing the shakuhachi

The shakuhachi is derived from the Chinese bamboo-flute. The bamboo-flute first came to Japan from China during the 7th or 8th century. This style of bamboo flute, also called kodai shakuhachi (古代尺八, ancient shakuhachi) or gagaku shakuhachi (雅楽尺八), was used for playing gagaku, but died out in the 10th century. Eight kodai shakuhachi remain in the Shōsō-in Treasure Repository. There are no records of musical scores related to the kodai shakuhachi, so details such as its playing method and scale are unknown. The average length was 40 cm (16 in), the diameter of the finger holes was 2 cm (0.79 in), and there were 6 finger holes – 5 at the front, 1 at the back.

In the 15th century, the hitoyogiri shakuhachi (一節切尺八) appeared. It is characterized by a single bamboo joint in the middle of the tube. Although it flourished in the 17th century, it gradually fell into disuse due to the development and popularity of the superior fuke shakuhachi, and was no longer used by the 19th century. The average length was 33.6 cm (13.2 in), the outer diameter was 3 cm (1.2 in), and there were 5 finger holes – 4 at the front, 1 at the back.

The flute now known as the shakuhachi was developed in Japan in the 16th century and is called the fuke shakuhachi (普化尺八). This style of shakuhachi is longer and thicker than the older shakuhachi, and its volume, range, scale, and tone are superior to those of the older shakuhachi. It is made from the base of the bamboo, and the average length is 54.5 cm (21.5 in), which corresponds to 1 shaku 8 sun; the outside diameter is 4 cm (1.6 in), and there are 5 finger holes – 4 at the front, 1 at the back.

During the medieval period, shakuhachi were most notable for their role in the Fuke sect of Zen Buddhist monks, known as komusō ("priests of nothingness" or "emptiness monks"), who used the shakuhachi as a spiritual tool. Their songs (called honkyoku) were paced according to the players' breathing and were considered meditation (suizen) as much as music.

Travel around Japan was restricted by the shogunate at this time, but the Fuke sect managed to wrangle an exemption from the shōgun, since their spiritual practice required them to move from place to place playing the shakuhachi and begging for alms (one famous song reflects this mendicant tradition: Hi fu mi, hachi gaeshi (一二三鉢返の調); "One two three, pass the alms bowl"). They persuaded the shōgun to give them exclusive rights to play the instrument. In return, some were required to spy for the shogunate, and the shōgun sent several of his own spies out in the guise of Fuke monks as well. This was made easier by the wicker baskets (天蓋, tengai) that the Fuke wore over their heads, a symbol of their detachment from the world.

In response to these developments, several particularly difficult honkyoku pieces, e.g. "Distant Call of the Deer" (鹿の遠音, Shika no tōne), became well known as "tests": if one could play them, they were a real Fuke monk. If they could not, they were probably a spy and might very well be killed if they were in unfriendly territory.

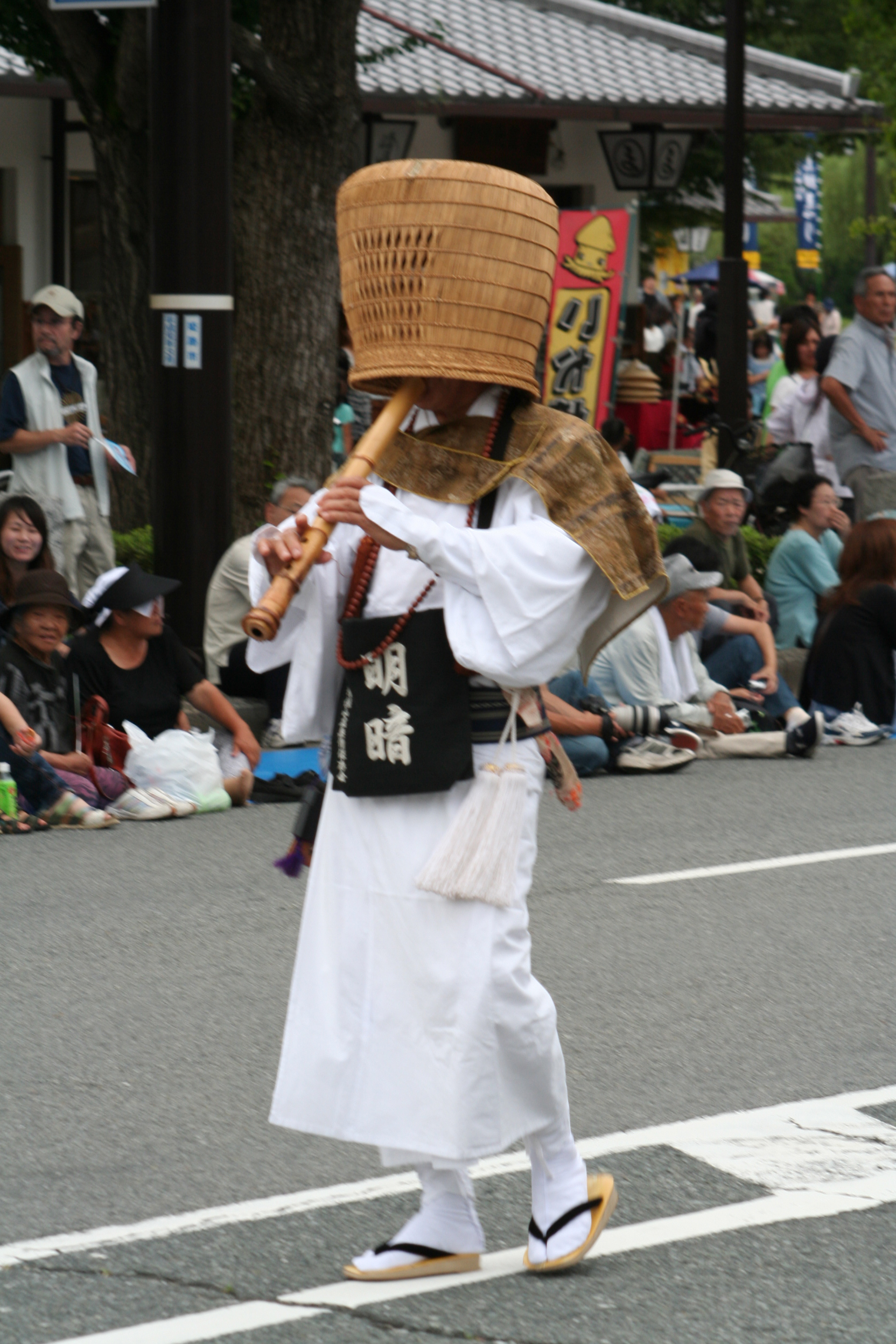
Performer playing shakuhachi at the 60th Himeji oshiro festival, 2009

With the Meiji Restoration, beginning in 1868, the shogunate was abolished and so was the Fuke sect, in order to help identify and eliminate the shōgun's holdouts. The very playing of the shakuhachi was officially forbidden for a few years. Non-Fuke folk traditions did not suffer greatly from this, since the tunes could be played just as easily on another pentatonic instrument. However, the honkyoku repertoire was known exclusively to the Fuke sect and transmitted by repetition and practice, and much of it was lost, along with many important documents.

When the Meiji government did permit the playing of shakuhachi again, it was only as an accompanying instrument to the koto, shamisen, etc. It was not until later that honkyoku were allowed to be played publicly again as solo pieces.

The shakuhachi has traditionally been played almost exclusively by men in Japan, although this situation is rapidly changing. Many teachers of traditional shakuhachi music indicate that a majority of their students are women. The 2004 Big Apple Shakuhachi Festival in New York City hosted the first-ever concert of international women shakuhachi masters. This festival was organized and produced by Ronnie Nyogetsu Reishin Seldin, who was the first full-time shakuhachi master to teach in the Western hemisphere. Nyogetsu also holds 2 Dai Shihan (Grand Master) licenses, and has run KiSuiAn, the largest and most active shakuhachi Dojo outside Japan, since 1975.

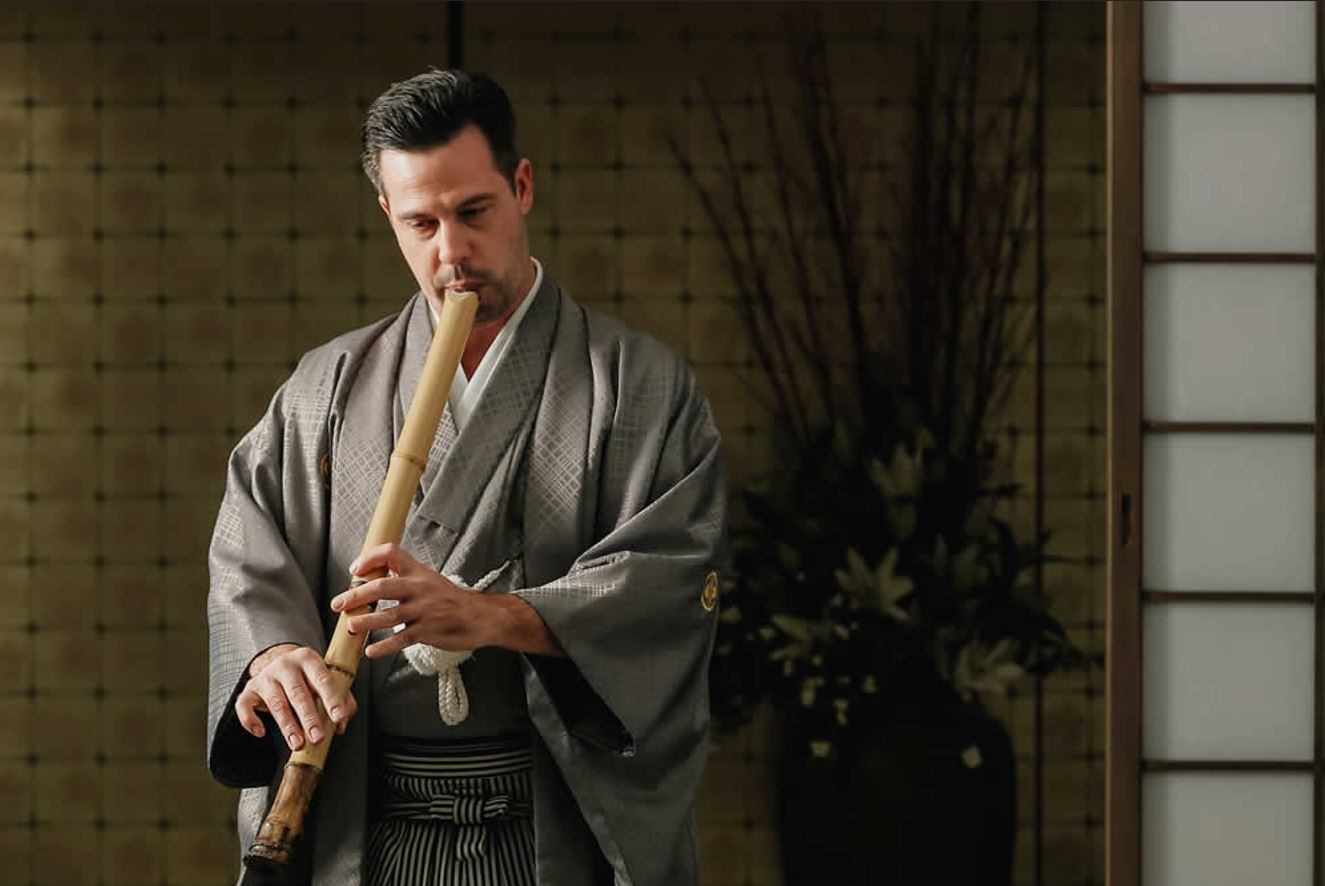
American shakuhachi enthusiast

The shakuhachi has grown in international popularity in recent decades. The first non-Japanese person to become a shakuhachi master was American-Australian Riley Lee. Lee was responsible for the World Shakuhachi Festival being held in Sydney, Australia over 5–8 July 2008, based at the Sydney Conservatorium of Music. Riley Lee played the shakuhachi in Dawn Mantras which was composed by Ross Edwards especially for the Dawn Performance, which took place on the sails of the Sydney Opera House at sunrise on 1 January 2000 and was televised internationally.

== Acoustics ==
Shakuhachi played by Markus Guhe at St Cecilia's Hall, Edinburgh

The shakuhachi creates a harmonic spectrum that contains the fundamental frequency together with even and odd harmonics and some blowing noise. Five tone holes enable musicians to play the notes D-F-G-A-C-D. Cross (or fork) fingerings, half-covering tone holes, and meri/kari blowing cause pitch sharpening, referred to as intonation anomaly. Especially the second and third harmonic exhibit the well-known shakuhachi timbre. Even though the geometry of the shakuhachi is relatively simple, the sound radiation of the shakuhachi is rather complicated. Sound radiating from several holes and the natural asymmetry of bamboo create an individual spectrum in each direction. This spectrum depends on frequency and playing technique.

== Notable players ==
The International Shakuhachi Society maintains a directory of notable professional, amateur, and teaching shakuhachi players.

== Recordings ==
Shika no Tōne
Honkyoku recording

The primary genres of shakuhachi music are:

- Honkyoku (traditional, solo)
- Sankyoku (ensemble, with koto and shamisen)
- Shinkyoku (new music composed for shakuhachi and koto, commonly post-Meiji period compositions influenced by Western music)

Recordings in each of these categories are available; however, more albums are catalogued in categories outside the traditional realm. As of 2018, shakuhachi players continue releasing records in a variety of traditional and modern styles.

The first shakuhachi recording appeared in the United States in the late 1960s. Gorō Yamaguchi recorded A Bell Ringing in the Empty Sky for Nonesuch Explorer Records on LP, an album which received acclaim from Rolling Stone at the time of its release. One of the pieces featured on Yamaguchi's record was "Sokaku Reibo", also called "Tsuru No Sugomori" (Crane's Nesting). NASA later chose to include this track as part of the Golden Record aboard the Voyager spacecraft.

== In the film industry ==
Shakuhachi are often used in modern film scores, for example those by James Horner. Films in which it is featured prominently include: The Karate Kid parts II and III by Bill Conti, Southern Comfort by Ry Cooder, Legends of the Fall and Braveheart by James Horner, Jurassic Park and its sequels by John Williams and Don Davis, and The Last Samurai by Hans Zimmer and Memoirs of a Geisha by John Williams.

Renowned Japanese classical and film-score composer Toru Takemitsu wrote many pieces for shakuhachi and orchestra, including his well-known Celeste, Autumn and November Steps.

== Western contemporary music ==
- The Australian shakuhachi master and composer Jim Franklyn has composed a number of works for solo shakuhachi, also including electronics.
- British composer John Palmer included a wide range of extended techniques in Koan (1999, for shakuhachi and ensemble)
- In Carlo Forlivesi's composition for shakuhachi and guitar "Ugetsu" (雨月), the performance techniques were remarked as "[presenting] notable difficulties in a few completely novel situations: an audacious movement of 'expansion' of the respective traditions of the two instruments pushed as they are at times to the limits of the possible, the aim being to have the shakuhachi and the guitar playing on the same level and with virtuosity (two instruments that are culturally and acoustically so dissimilar), thus increasing the expressive range, the texture of the dialogue, the harmonic dimension and the tone-colour."
- American composer and performer Elizabeth Brown plays shakuhachi and has written many pieces for the instrument that build on Japanese traditions while diverging with more modern arrangement, orchestration, melodic twists or harmonic progressions.
- New York-born musician James Nyoraku Schlefer plays, teaches, and composes for shakuhachi.
- Composer Carson Kievman has employed the instrument in many works from "Ladies Voices" in 1976 to "Feudal Japan" in the parallel world opera Passion Love Gravity in 2020–21.
- Progressive rock songwriter Roger Waters played the instrument on the song ‘Me or Him’ on his 1987 concept album Radio KAOS
- Brian Ritchie of the Violent Femmes formed a jazz quintet in 2002 called The N.Y.C. Shakuhachi Club. They play avant-garde jazz versions of tradition American folk and blues songs with Ritchie's shakuhachi playing as the focal point. In 2004 they released their debut album on Weed Records.
- Welsh composer Karl Jenkins features prominent shakuhachi solos in his 2005 Requiem, specifically in the movements where the texts are death haikus.
- American multi-instrumentalist and composer Zac Zinger is a shakuhachi specialist, featuring it on his progressive-jazz album Fulfillment, as well as playing it on the score of Just Cause 4 and the promotional album for Kamigawa: Neon Dynasty, from Magic: The Gathering.
- "Nobody's Listening", a 2003 rap rock song from the album Meteora by Linkin Park, features the shakuhachi flute.
- British jazz musician Shabaka Hutchings performed shakuhachi on the André 3000 album New Blue Sun

== Synthesized/sampled shakuhachi ==
The sound of the shakuhachi is also featured from time to time in electronica, pop and rock, especially after being commonly shipped as a "preset" instrument on various synthesizers and keyboards beginning in the 1980s. The General MIDI standard assigns the shakuhachi to program number 78. One of the best known pop songs of the 1980s that uses this sound is "Sledgehammer" by Peter Gabriel. This was also used in the ident of the short-lived Coca-Cola Telecommunications.

== See also ==
- Chiba (尺八, the original Chinese version)
- Hotchiku (a similar, end-blown bamboo flute)
- List of shakuhachi players
- Quena (a similar flute from South America)
- Sankyoku
- Shakuhachi musical notation
