= Katherine Hoover =

American composer and flutist (1937–2018)

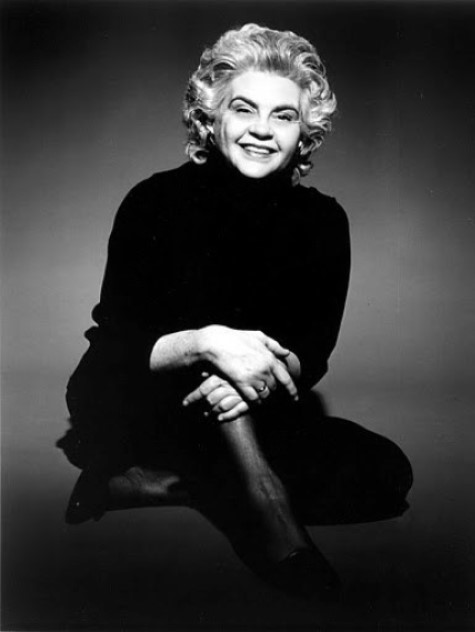
- Born: Katherine Lacy Hoover; December 2, 1937; Elkins, West Virginia, U.S.
- Died: September 21, 2018 (aged 80); New York City
- Resting place: Cremated; ashes scattered in a place of family significance.
- Education: Eastman School of Music (Bachelor of Music in Music Theory) (Performer's Certificate in Flute); Manhattan School of Music (Master of Music in Music Theory)
- Occupations: Composer; Flutist; Educator; Publisher; Author
- Years active: 1959–2018
- Title: Co-Founder of Papagena Press (1988)
- Spouse(s): John Christopher Schwab (m. 1964-1972); Richard V. Goodwin (m. 1985-2018)
- Musical career
- Genres: Contemporary classical music; Contemporary chamber music
- Instruments: flutes; piano
- Labels: Theodore Presser; Boelke Boemart/Schott; Songs of Peer; Carl Fischer; Warner Chappell Music; Papagena Press
- Website: katherinehoover.com

Katherine Hoover (December 2, 1937 – September 21, 2018) was an American composer of contemporary classical music and chamber music, flutist, composition and theory educator, poet, and conductor. Her career as a composer began in the 1970s, when few women composers earned recognition in classical music. She composed pieces for solo flute, mixed ensembles, chamber orchestra, choir, full orchestra, and many other combinations of instruments and voice. Two works of hers were co-written under the pseudonym Kathryn Scott. Some of her flute pieces incorporate Native American themes.

Her work has received many honors, including a National Endowment for the Arts Composer's Fellowship, an American Academy of Arts and Letters Award in composition, and the National Flute Association's Lifetime Achievement Award, where she is remembered by as an "artist, flutist, teacher, entrepreneur, poet, and, most notably, a distinguished composer."

== Life and career ==
Katherine Lacey Hoover was born on December 2, 1937, in Elkins, West Virginia, where her mother's family was from. They lived in Washington, D.C., at 2017 Hillyer Pl NW, near Dupont Circle. She remembers her love for music started at the age of three when she was entranced by the melodies of Mozart. Standing in front of a large record player, young Hoover felt captivated by the music. That moment ignited her passion for music.

The onset of World War II brought significant changes to Hoover's life. Her father, driven by a sense of duty, asked to be reassigned to the Department of Agriculture's Eastern Regional Research Center in Wyndmoor, Pennsylvania. This role was better suited to his expertise in pasteurization and also contributed directly to the war effort. The family rented out their home in D.C. and relocated to a two-family house on Linden Rd. Katherine's father happily took advantage of walking to work at the research center. However, the private consequences of moving from the city to suburbia have not been detailed.

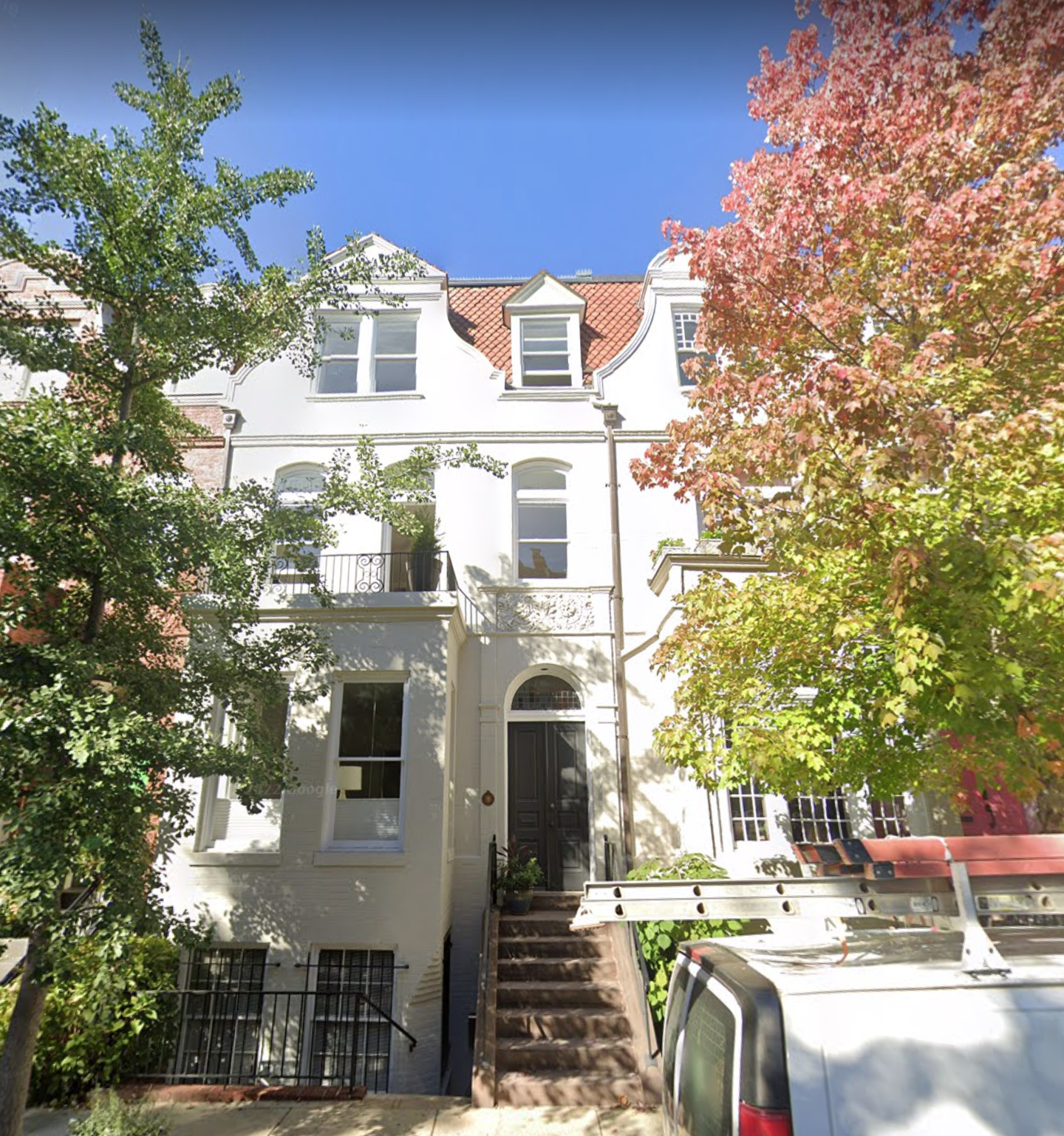
Katherine Hoover (newborn's home 1937)

When Hoover's family moved to Linden Road, her father rescued a piano their neighbors were about to abandon. Despite being out of tune and having broken pedal action, her father had the piano tuned, and this fueled Katherine's passionate and persistent pleas for piano lessons. Although her parents had no musical training, they supported Katherine's artistic inclinations, starting her in piano lessons at age five. Hoover fondly remembered those early days, saying, "[Her parents] would play a game, just putting their hands down anywhere in any combination and asking me what notes they were playing. Then, turn to young Hoover to query the notes they had just played. This unique ear training, Katherine believes, contributed significantly to her development of perfect pitch, a rare and invaluable gift.

In primary school, Hoover was given the option to learn how to play the clarinet as her first instrument. However, she did not enjoy playing it because it caused discomfort due to biting, pressure, and being in the wrong key. She was ecstatic when her music teacher offered her the chance to play the flute instead, and she began taking flute lessons in fourth grade at the age of eight.

During her high school years at Springfield Township, Hoover found a diverse musical education. She participated in various musical activities, including bands, marching bands, and the Eastern Pennsylvania State Band. Additionally, she was a member of the "Quintones" singers for five years, which led to her numerous appearances on radio and early television programs. Later in life, when asked about her scholastic music instruction, Katherine apologetically responded that it was "mediocre," expressing the desire for a faster learning curve in hindsight, especially considering her artistic aspirations.

=== University of Rochester ===
Hoover's parents didn't see music as a viable career option, likely due to their experiences during the Great Depression. Consequently, they pushed her towards academics, leading to Hoover enrolling at the University of Rochester in 1955, where she pursued a general studies major. After two years, Katherine transferred to the Eastman School of Music. However, Hoover was often ignored and discouraged as the only woman in her classes, saying: "There were no women involved with composition. [I got] rather discouraged – being the only woman in my classes, being ignored, and so forth." While at Eastman, I learned of Nadia Boulanger, who has taught in France and the USA for decades.

Hoover earned a Bachelor of Music in Music Theory with honors in 1959. She accomplished a double major and was awarded the prestigious Performer's Certificate in Flute. This certificate also allowed her to perform solo with an orchestra, a significant achievement at Eastman. Her studies at Eastman acquainted her with the American Flute School movement through Joseph Mariano, a student of William Kincaid who was highly regarded by eminent conductors such as Toscanini, Fritz Reiner, and Eugene Ormandy throughout his career.

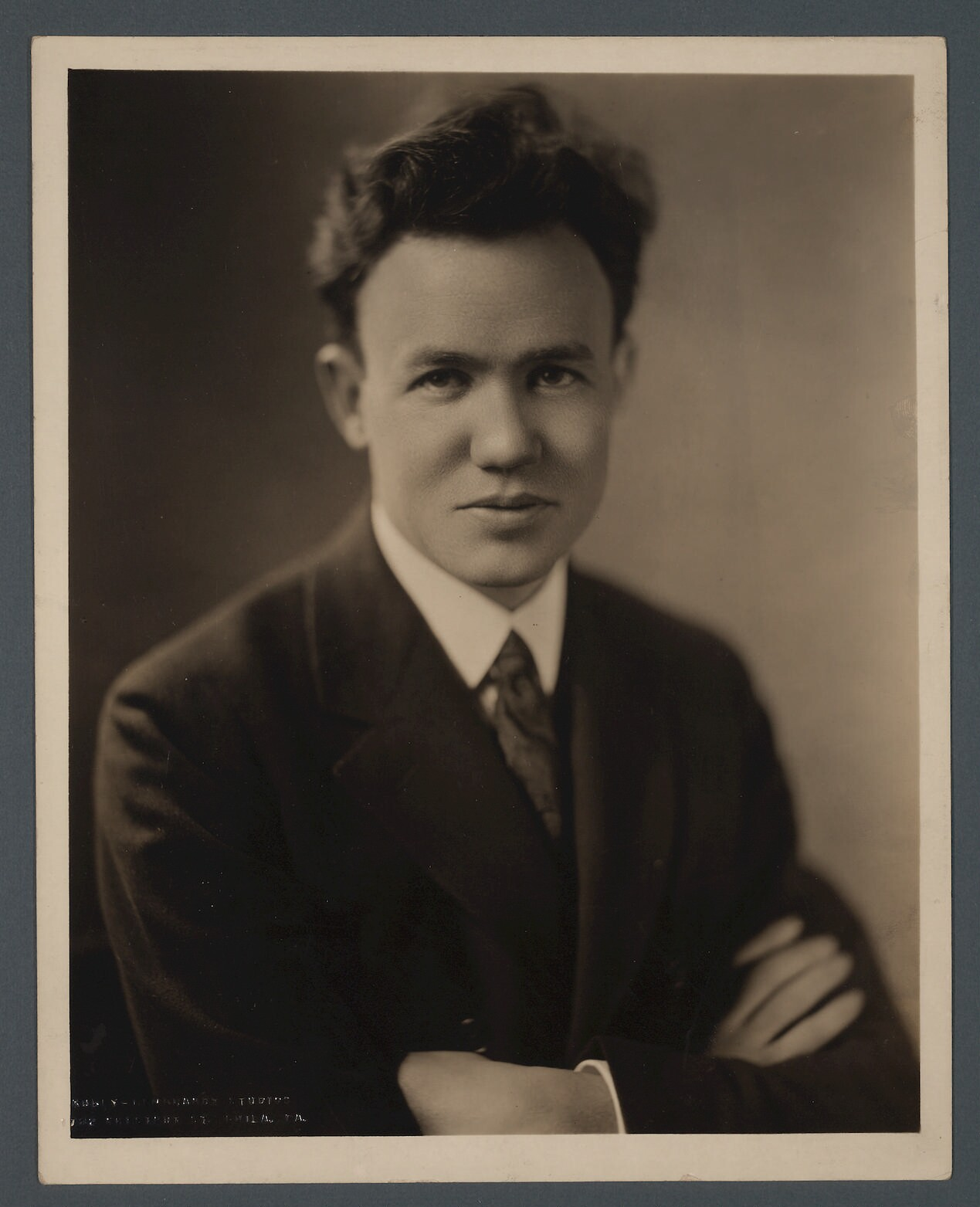
William Kincaid

=== Philadelphia ===
After graduating, Hoover spent two years studying with William Kincaid. According to Hoover, Kincaid's pedagogical approach to flute playing became the foundation of her playing, musical understanding, and writing. Hoover reflected that Kincaid's standards were very high, and she had to work hard to meet them. Later in her career, Katherine, as a member and board member of The New York Flute Club, wrote that she owed much of her success to her mentor, who taught her more about music than any other composer.

Hoover also studied with Mme. Agi Jambor, a distinguished pianist who fled Hungary during World War II. Jambor taught and performed at Bryn Mawr College, and Katherine worked as a residential advisor at an undergraduate dormitory there. Jambor had a great love for and specialized in Bach; Hoover learned much from Jambor by listening to her play and speak about the Baroque composer.

=== New York City ===
Several years after graduating from Eastman, Hoover moved to New York, where she established herself as a flutist and teacher. She taught flute at the preparatory division of the Juilliard School and also at several other small schools, including the Third Street Music School from 1962 to 1967. In 1964, she married John Christopher Schwab, (m.1964-1972).

Hoover's career as a composer began slowly. As a scholastic student, she was unaware of any notable contemporary classical female composers. A decade later, after settling in New York, she published her first work, Three Carols (1972), for SSA chorus and flute, through Carl Fischer. During this period, she worked as a freelance flutist for multiple ballet and opera companies.

From 1969 until 1984, Hoover taught flute and music theory at the Manhattan School of Music. During this time, she analyzed a wide range of music scores and learned a great deal about compositional techniques. She also continued her graduate studies and earned a Master of Music in Music Theory in 1973. In 1984, Hoover began teaching theory and composition to graduate students as a faculty member at Teachers College, Columbia University, a position she held until 1989.

Hoover was actively involved with women's arts organizations and dedicated her efforts to promoting the works of women composers to the public. In 1977, she collaborated with the Women's Inter-Art Center in New York and organized the Festivals I, II, and III of Women's Music. These festivals showcased the music of 55 women composers, both historical and contemporary. Her efforts in this area continued when she was named composer in residence for the Fourth Festival of Women Composers at Indiana University of Pennsylvania (1996).

In 1978, Hoover's growth as a composer was recognized when she became a finalist for the Kennedy Center Friedheim Award's Outstanding New American Chamber Work. She repeated this achievement the following year and was also awarded a National Endowment for the Arts Composer's Fellowship in 1979.

In 1988 Hoover co-founded Papagena Press with her second husband Richard Goodwin (married 1985) to publish her works. The first publication was Kokopeli (1990), a solo flute composition inspired by Kokopelli, the Hopi tribe and the American Southwest.

Katherine Hoover performs her Kokopeli for flute

It won the National Flute Association's Newly Published Music Competition in 1991 and is one of six NFA Newly Published Music awards received by Hoover. Hoover has expressed pride in her ability to create works for specific performers using different instruments. Two notable examples include "Stitch-te Naku" for cello and orchestra, which was written for cellist Sharon Robinson and a Clarinet Concerto, which was performed by jazz clarinetist Eddie Daniels.

Hoover had always written poetry since her youth, finding both a striking difference and similarity between music and words. "This Way About" (2015). was her first book of poetry where she shares glimpses into her life.

== Musical style and works ==
=== Selected compositions ===
Title	Notes
Kokopeli	Composed in 1986, this work for solo flute was awarded the National Flute Association's Newly Published Music Award, 1991.
Eleni	Composed in 1979, this work for orchestra premiered by the Harrisburg Symphony with Larry Newland conducting.
Clarinet Concerto	Composed in 1987, this work was premiered by Eddie Daniels with the Santa Fe Symphony.
Dances and Variations	Composed in 1995, was the subject of Emmy winning PBS Documentary, Deborah Novak's New Music.
Winter Spirits	Composed in 1997, Premiered by Jeffrey Khaner, National Flute Association Convention, 1997.
The String Quartets	Composed in 1998 and 2004, for the Colorado String Quartet.
Mountain & Mesa	Composed in 2008, this work for flute and piano was premiered by Mimi Stillman and Jeremy Gill in 2009.
Canyon Shadows	Hoover's original manuscript dates the piece to 1997. The piece was edited by Joanne Lazaro in 2019 after the composer's death and was awarded the NFA's Newly Published Music Award co-winner in 2020.

=== Compositional style ===
Hoover's compositional style is widely recognized for its unique and romantic character, often described as a "romantic, often pictorial atonal style." Her music is known for its clarity and elegance, with moments of stunning beauty arising from her occasionally dissonant harmonies. Her unique style bears the unmistakable imprint of her mentors Joseph Mariano and William Kincaid. One foundational aspect of her music, as she acknowledges, is the concept of transitioning from a weak beat to a strong beat – a lesson she learned from Mariano and Kincaid. Hoover's desire for long, unimpeded musical phrases led her to subvert musical conventions implied by the use of notational elements such as barlines. Her compositions invite musicians to respond not just to the notation, but also to the acoustics of their instrument and the performance space.

Hoover has shared that her journey as a composer involved a significant degree of self-discovery. Her tenure as a theory student and teacher at the Manhattan School enabled her to delve into a variety of compositional techniques, further enriching her musical arsenal. Hoover also believed that being proficient in an instrument gave one a unique advantage in understanding the intricacies of creating music at a high level. This knowledge fostered a deep respect for performers and their unique needs. Hoover's expertise in composing for the flute was evident in her idiomatic flute compositions. This insight has been shared individually, with both Alicia Joyelle Kosack and Kristine H. Burns, Ed.

"Hoover composes with the effects peculiar to each individual instrument in mind, incorporating such effects into the thematic and emotive content of the work at hand. . . . [While some] demonstrate a great gift for expressive lyricism, . . . [others] are notable for rhythmically dynamic passages laced with incisive dissonance but often mingled with elements of jazz and well-timed humor."

Although her primary instrument was the flute, Hoover was also skilled in composing for a wide range of instruments and ensemble configurations, including orchestral works and concertos. A significant portion of her work focused on chamber compositions, likely a choice made in light of the evolving landscape of orchestral programming of the 20th century.

John Corigliano described Hoover as a composer with a wide and fascinating musical vocabulary, dazzling craftsmanship, and the promise of well-deserved recognition on a broader scale.

==== Extra-musical references ====
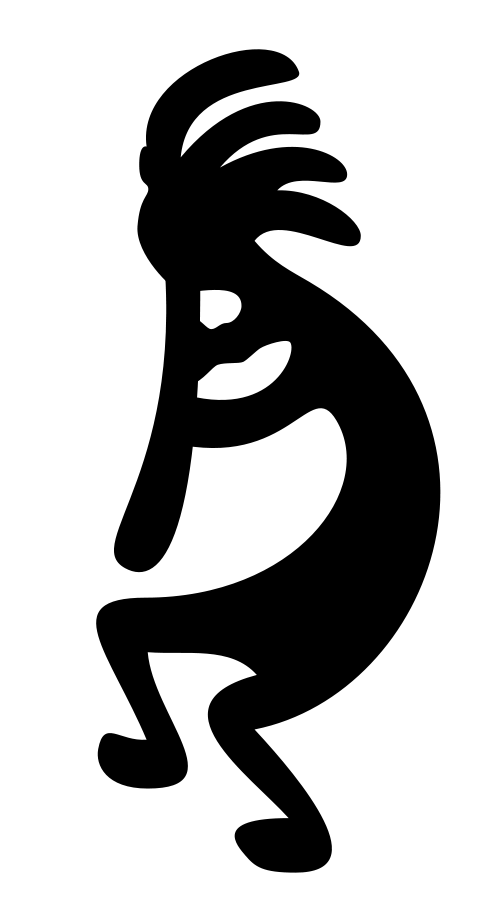
A modern, commercialized Kokopelli figure

Hoover's compositions draw inspiration from a diverse range of sources – Native American music in flute pieces, such as "Kokopeli", "Winter Spirits", and "To Greet the Sun", Nicholas Gage's "Eleni" in an orchestral tone poem, Barbara Tuchman's "A Distant Mirror: The Calamitous Fourteenth Century" in Medieval Suite, and a painting of the starry night sky in "Night Skies".

Hoover skillfully incorporates musical quotations and adapts melodies from other composers into her compositions, creating a rich tapestry of musical influences. In her work "Celebration", she blends her own thematic material with direct quotations from well-known flute works. Notably, her use of musical quotation is not always overt, as seen in the first movement of "Medieval Suite," where she quotes Guillaume de Machaut's "Virelai No. 17, Dame, vostre doulz viaire debonair" in fragmented form, altering its pitch level. Subsequently, an extended quote appears at the original pitch level, achieved through the use of harmonics overblown at the twelfth.

As Cathy Hancock Hicks writes:

“Hoover openly borrows from the compositional techniques of other composers. At Eastman, she worked with a student of Hindemith, … and became familiar with Hindemith's theories of consonance and dissonance. Bartok also influenced Hoover's music, particularly in the harmonies she utilizes… related to the “split-root” or “major-diminished” chord… [as heard in the] final movement of Medieval Suite. Bartok's influence is also clear in the title of her first woodwind quintet, Homage to Bartok (1975).”

=== Discography ===
As a flutist, Hoover has performed other composers' works, as well as her own. The following is a selected list of her recorded performances.

Title	Album details	Work performed	Composer	Instrument
Original Broadway Cast "Jesus Christ Superstar"	Release: 1971; Music LP	Jesus Christ Superstar Soundtrack	Andrew Lloyd Webber	Flute & Piccolo
Music Of Dale Jergenson	Release: 1977; Music LP	Tanka Pieces	Dale Jergenson	Flute
Sonata da chiesa	Release: 1982; Music LP	Sonata Da Chiesa Daysongs Variations	Frank Martin Nancy Laird Chance Ursula Mamlok	fl afl fl[C]
New Music for Flute	Release: 1984; Music LP	The Medieval Suite Reflections	Hoover Hoover	fl fl
Chaitkin	Release: 1981; Music LP, CD, eMusic	Summersong	David Chaitkin	fl
Journeys	Release: 1987; Music CD	Summer Night	Hoover	fl
Kokopeli : Katherine Hoover plays	Release: 2001; Music CD	1. Sonata no. 2, in G 2. Sonata no. 4, in A 3. Sonata in G, K. 27; 4. Sonata no. 2, in F minor 5. Carmen-Entr'acte; 6. Trio of the young Ishmaelite; 7. Winter spirits 8. Masks; 9. Kokopeli	1. Pleyel; 2. J.C. Bach; 3. Mozart; 4. Abe; 5. Bizet-Delsaux; 6. Berlioz; 7. Hoover; 8. Hoover; 9. Hoover	1. 1911 wooden fl 2. 1911 wooden fl 3. 1911 wooden fl 4. 1911 wooden fl 5. fl 6. fl 7. fl 8. fl 9. fl

=== Honors and awards ===
- Member Laureate, Sigma Alpha Iota
- Kennedy Center Friedheim Award, Outstanding New American Chamber Work, finalist, 1978, 1979
- National Endowment for the Arts Composer's Fellowship, 1979
- National Flute Association Newly Published Music Competition, 1987, 1991, 1993, 1994, 2006, 2020(co-winner)
- New York State Music Teachers' Association, Composer of the Year, 1989
- American Academy of Arts and Letters Academy Award in Composition, 1994
- New York Flute Club Tribute Concert for Katherine Hoover, 2013
- National Flute Association Lifetime Achievement Award, 2016
- Global Music Awards, Silver Medalist, May 2018
