= Elaine Shaffer =

American flutist (1925–1973)

- Born: 22 October 1925; Altoona, Pennsylvania
- Died: 19 February 1973 (aged 47)
- Education: Curtis Institute of Music
- Occupation: flutist

Elaine Shaffer (October 22, 1925 – February 19, 1973) was an American flutist and principal of the Houston Symphony Orchestra between 1948 and 1953.

== Biography ==
Elaine Shaffer was born in Altoona, Pennsylvania. She attended the Curtis Institute of Music in Philadelphia and was the prize student of William Kincaid, the 'grandfather' of the majority of flutists in the United States. That he willed his platinum flute to her makes his regard for her talent evident. Kincaid was her only formal flute teacher; prior to that, she was entirely self-taught, according to an interview with Shaffer's widowed husband, Efrem Kurtz, published in the National Flute Association Newsletter in the 1980s.

Shaffer played for a season as second flute in the Kansas City Philharmonic (1947–1948). Apparently she was not shy — she really did not want to accept the position, though she had been recommended by an oboist in the orchestra, Laila Storch — and she held out not only for more money, but to be allowed to fulfill another engagement prior to starting the job, and a concerto appearance with the orchestra. She surprised the critics, the audience, and Kurtz not only with her playing, but her artistry as well. As this was the 1940s, women had just begun to get positions in orchestras, making Shaffer something of a trail-blazer. The music director at the time was Efrem Kurtz, which was how they first met, though the two did not marry until 1955, after she had left the Houston Symphony Orchestra — and he had divorced his wife.

After holding the principal flutist's chair in Houston for five years (1948–1953), she left to pursue a career as a soloist and chamber musician (another first for an American woman) winning praise for her debut recital in London. She performed at many festivals in Europe, and worked closely with violinist Yehudi Menuhin, pianist Hephzibah Menuhin, and harpsichordist George Malcolm. The composer Ernest Bloch dedicated two works to her: Suite Modale and Two Last Poems (Maybe...). The former piece had been commissioned by the flutist; at her request, Bloch also orchestrated the piece (written for flute and piano) for flute and string orchestra. Shaffer also gave the world premiere of the latter work. She was also a friend of Marc Chagall (who did a drawing for her), Karl Barth, and Hermann Hesse.

The death of William Kincaid, her principal teacher, in 1967 was difficult for her because she had a special bond with him. John Solum, a flutist and pioneering baroque flutist, became the prime mover (along with a group of other students and admirers of Kincaid) behind the commission of Aaron Copland's Duo for Flute and Piano, dedicated to Kincaid's memory. Solum, a close friend and colleague of Shaffer, invited her and Hephzibah Menuhin to perform the world premiere of that work in October 1971 at a benefit for the Settlement Music School in Philadelphia. A short while later, Shaffer was diagnosed with lung cancer. She was able to complete two final projects that were important to her: a concert of J. S. Bach's sonatas for flute, and the first recording of the Copland. Two months after the recording was completed, Elaine Shaffer died in London on February 19, 1973.

== Recordings ==
- Johann Sebastian Bach
  - Three Flute Sonatas (volume 1): Sonata in b minor BWV 1030, Sonata in A Major BWV 1032 (2nd and 3rd movements), Sonata in E Minor BWV 1034 - with George Malcolm - harpsichord, Ambrose Gauntlett - viola da gamba - Angel S36337
  - Three Flute Sonatas (volume 2): Sonata in c major BWV 1033, BWV 1035, BWV 1031, BWV 1020 - with George Malcolm - harpsichord, Ambrose Gauntlett - viola da gamba - Angel
  - Suite No.2 in B Minor, BWV 1067 : with Yehudi Menuhin / Bath Festival Orchestra
  - Musical Offering, BWV 1079 : Ricercare / 5 Canons / Trio Sonata / 5 Canons / Ricercare - with Archie Camden / Ronald Kinloch Anderson / Yehudi Menuhin
  - Brandenburg Concerto No.5 in D, BWV 1050 : with Yehudi Menuhin / George Malcolm / Bath Festival Orchestra
- Wolfgang Amadeus Mozart
  - Concerto for flute and orchestra, K 313
  - Concerto for flute and orchestra, K 314
  - Andante in C for flute and orchestra, K 315
  - Concerto for flute and harp, K 299 (with Marilyn Costello, harp)
- Georg Philipp Telemann
  - Suite in A minor for flute and strings
- Franz Schubert
  - Variations on "Trockne Blumen", op 160
- Friedrich Kuhlau
  - Sonata in E minor
- Franz Xavier Mozart
  - Sonata movement (mistakenly called "Rondo" on the recording)
- Aaron Copland
  - Duo for Flute and Piano - with Aaron Copland - piano - On Modern American Music Series M32737 - Copland Performs and Conducts Copland - CBS 1974

Some of these recordings are now available on CD : Suite No. 2/Musical Offering/ Brandenburg V included in the Christmas Box 2001 - Bach Orchestral Suites / Brandenburgs / Violin Concertos - Yehudi Menuhin / Bath Festival Orchestra on EMI Classics 0724357443920.

She also performed the major standard flute repertoire of the 20th century, including sonatas by Hindemith, Prokofiev and Poulenc, and the flute concerti of Ibert and Nielsen. She gave the world premiere of Virgil Thomson's Flute Concerto, as well as five performances with Italian orchestras of a concerto by Franco Mannino for flute, trombone obbligato, and orchestra.

== Sources ==
"Elaine Shaffer, Flutist, 47, Dies; Toured World Capitals as Soloist". The New York Times. February 19, 1973.
