= Daniel Dorff =

American classical musician and composer (born 1956)

Daniel J. Dorff
- Born: March 7, 1956 (age 70); New Rochelle, New York
- Education: Cornell University; University of Pennsylvania
- Occupations: Composer; musician
- Known for: Composing classical music
- Website: www.danieldorff.com

Daniel Dorff (born March 7, 1956) is an American classical musician and classical composer.

== Biography and career ==
Dorff was born in New Rochelle, New York, and grew up in Flower Hill, New York, graduating from Roslyn High School.

Dorff graduated magna cum laude from Cornell University and earned his master's degree in composition from the University of Pennsylvania, studying composition with George Crumb, George Rochberg, Karel Husa, Henry Brant, Ralph Shapey, Elie Siegmeister, and Richard Wernick. Dorff served from 1996 through 2015 as composer-in-residence for Symphony in C (formerly The Haddonfield Symphony) in Camden, New Jersey (USA). His works have been commissioned by such ensembles as the Philadelphia Orchestra and Minnesota Orchestra, and performed by groups and individuals including the Baltimore Symphony, Eastman Wind Ensemble, flutists and clarinetists of the Chicago Symphony and Berlin Philharmonic, pianist Marc-André Hamelin, and flutists Jean-Pierre Rampal, Jasmine Choi, Denis Bouriakov, and frequent collaborator Cindy Anne Broz. He has also created arrangements for Sir James Galway and pop musicians Keith Emerson and Lisa Loeb.

Dorff has written many frequently-performed recital works for woodwinds, and music for orchestra, concert band, piano, chorus, and chamber ensembles, including often-neglected instruments such as contrabassoon, bass clarinet, and tenor saxophone – the best-known of which is In A Deep Funk, a dance suite for unaccompanied contrabassoon or bass clarinet. In addition to his compositional career, Dorff is a clarinetist and saxophonist and was bass clarinetist for the Haddonfield Symphony for 20 years prior to Alan Gilbert appointing him composer-in-residence. He frequently lectures on music engraving and notation, a subject in which he is expert. Dorff is currently vice president of publishing for music publisher Theodore Presser Company; his input has also been sought in the development of leading music notation software.

== Works ==
=== Narrated works for young audiences ===
Dorff has taken a particular interest in exposing young people to classical music; many of his works are written for young audiences, including Three Fun Fables, a setting for narrator and orchestra of familiar Aesop tales; Billy and the Carnival, a narrated guide to the instruments of the orchestra; Blast Off!, a travelog of a trip to outer space (the score to which was flown by NASA on the 100th mission of the Space Shuttle); and familiar stories such as Goldilocks and the Three Bears, The Three Little Pigs, and The Tortoise and the Hare, and Stone Soup: An Operatic Fable in One Delicious Act which has enjoyed well over 1000 performances.

- A Treeful of Monkeys for narrator and orchestra (or mixed quintet)
- Billy and the Carnival – A Children's Guide to Musical Instruments for narrator and orchestra
- Blast Off! for narrator and orchestra
- Goldilocks and the Three Bears for narrator and orchestra (or mixed octet)
- Old MacDonald Had an Orchestra for narrator and mixed quintet
- Take The Orchestra Out to the Ballgame for narrator and orchestra (or mixed quintet)
- The Adventures of Mary's Little Lamb for narrator and mixed quintet
- The Bear Went Under the Mountain for narrator mixed quintet
- The Three Little Pigs for narrator, violin, and cello
- The Tortoise and the Hare for narrator and orchestra (or mixed octet)
- Three Fun Fables for narrator and orchestra (or mixed octet)

=== Selected chamber music ===
Some chamber pieces composed by Dorff include:

- 9 Walks Down 7th Avenue for flute and piano
- Allegro Volante for xylophone and piano
- Andante con Variazioni for flute and clarinet
- April Whirlwind for flute and piano
- August Idyll for solo flute
- Ballade for alto flute, flugelhorn (or bass flute), and piano
- BFF's for E♭ clarinet and B♭ clarinet
- Big Sky for flute, viola, and harp
- Blue Jacaranda for two flutes and piano
- Cape May Breezes for wind quintet
- Cosmic Menagerie for two bass clarinets
- Dance Music for Mr. Mouse for E♭ clarinet and piano
- Dark Romance for clarinet quartet
- Deep Funk, Part 2, Dance Sonata for solo viola
- Desert Dusk for alto flute and cello
- Fanfare and Hustle for brass quintet
- Fantasy, Scherzo and Nocturne for saxophone quartet
- Fast Walk for saxophone quartet or clarinet quartet or bassoon quartet
- Fireworks for flute orchestra
- Flash! for piccolo and piano
- Flowers of St. Francis, five scenes for solo bass clarinet
- Folk Song Suite for two flutes
- For Elise for flute and piano
- Hot Spots for B♭ Clarinet and English Horn
- In a Deep Funk dance set for solo contrabassoon (or bass clarinet)
- Invention after BWV 1013 for two flutes
- Invention on Mozart's 11-tone Surprise for flute and clarinet
- It Takes Four to Tango for sax quartet or clarinet quartet (or many other instrumentations)
- Midsummer Daydream for flute, viola, and harp
- Nocturnes for the Nativity for solo flute
- Pastorale (Souvenirs du Frög) for clarinet and piano
- Perennials for flute, clarinet, and piano
- Perfect Storm for piccolo, flute, and piano
- Romanza on a theme of Rochberg for solo piano
- Serenade for Flute and Harp
- Serenade to Eve, After Rodin for flute and guitar
- Seven Daydreams on Can't Find My Way Home for solo bass clarinet
- Shadows for solo timpani
- Snow Angel for flute and piano
- Slippery Slopes for mixed clarinet sextet or ensemble
- Sonata (Spirit of the Hudson) for bass flute and piano
- Sonata (Three Lakes) for flute and piano
- Sonatina d'Amore for two contrabassoons or two bass clarinets
- Sonatine de Giverny for piccolo and piano
- Songs of the Open Road (Five Inspirations from Walt Whitman) for solo flute
- Spark for solo viola
- Swans for 2 alto flutes and piano
- The Day Things Went Wrong at the Pet Store – 11 Cartoons for Piano
- Three Dance Etudes for marimba duo or ensemble
- The Seven Chakras for tenor saxophone and piano
- The Three Little Pigs for narrator, violin, and cello
- Three Romances for flute and clarinet
- The Year of the Rabbit for flute quartet or ensemble
- Through a Misty Arch for flute ensemble
- Trees (after the poem by Joyce Kilmer) for solo flute with narration
- Tweet for solo piccolo
- The Seven Chakras for tenor saxophone and piano
- Two Cats for flute and clarinet
- Woodland Reverie for solo flute or solo bass clarinet
- Zoe & Xena for piccolo and bass clarinet

=== Selected orchestral music ===
Some orchestral pieces composed by Dorff include:

- A Treeful of Monkeys for narrator with orchestra or mixed quintet
- Allegro Volante for xylophone and orchestra (or band)
- Billy and the Carnival: A Children's Guide to Musical Instruments for narrator and orchestra
- Blast Off! for narrator and orchestra
- Concertino for flute and orchestra (or piano)
- Concerto for Contrabassoon with clarinet, horn, and strings
- Concerto No. 2 for clarinet and orchestra
- Flash! for piccolo and orchestra
- Goldilocks and the Three Bears for narrator with orchestra or mixed octet
- Pachelbel's Christmas (A Merry Melange) for orchestra
- Philly Rhapsody for orchestra
- Stone Soup: An Operatic Fable in One Act, an opera for young audiences with soloists, mixed choir, and accompaniment
- Summer Solstice Concerto for clarinet and string orchestra
- Take the Orchestra Out to the Ballgame for narrator and orchestra
- The Kiss (after a painting by Gustav Klimt) for orchestra
- Three Fun Fables for narrator and orchestra or mixed octet
- The Tortoise and the Hare for narrator and orchestra or mixed octet
- Symphony of Delusions

== Discography ==
- Andante con Variazioni (Albany Records TROY 1404), Leonard Garrison flute, Shannon Scott clarinet
- April Whirlwind (private label), Angela Massey flute, Vahan Sargsyan piano
- August Idyll (Cantilena Records 66042–2), Laurel Zucker solo flute
- August Idyll (private label), Kristen Stoner
- Ballade (Austrian Gramophone AG0035), Kathleen Nester alto flute, Wendy Stern bass flute, Katie Leung piano
- Billy and the Carnival: A Children's Guide to the Instruments (Bridge Records 9229), Ukee Washington narrator, Rossen Milanov conducting Symphony in C
- Blast Off (Bridge Records 9229), Ukee Washington narrator, Rossen Milanov conducting Symphony in C
- Dances and Canons (Albany Records TROY 1404), Leonard Garrison flute, Shannon Scott clarinet
- Fast Walk (Meister Music MM-1016 and MM-1133), Harmo Saxophone Quartet
- Flash! (90002, distr. Harmonia Mundi), Gudrun Hinze piccolo, Markus Zügehor piano
- Flash! (private label), Kate Prestia-Schaub piccolo, Martin Kennedy piano
- Flash! (Numar Un MM 52–16), Nicola Mazzanti piccolo, Ferdinando Mussutto piano
- Goldilocks and the Three Bears (Bridge Records 92292), Ann Crumb narrator, Rossen Milanov conducting Symphony in C
- It Takes Four to Tango (Farao Classics B108011), Interclarinet Ensemble
- It Takes Four to Tango (Meister Music MM-1016), Harmo Saxophone Quartet
- It Takes Four to Tango (Sea Breeze Records SEAB 3059), The Miles Osland Saxophone Quartet
- Meditation at Perkiomen Creek (Azica Records 71349), Yolanda Kondonassis, harp
- 9 Walks Down 7th Avenue (Azica Records 71257), Pamela Youngblood flute, Gabriel Bita piano
- Nocturne Caprice (private label), Mimi Stillman solo flute
- Pastorale (Souvenirs du Frög) (Albany Records TROY 1404), Shannon Scott clarinet, Rajung Yang piano
- Perennials (Albany Records TROY 1404), Leonard Garrison flute, Shannon Scott clarinet, Rajung Yang piano
- Serenade to Eve (after Rodin) (Barking Dog Records), Deborah Harris flute, Mike Coates guitar
- Serenade to Eve (after Rodin) (private label), Jenny Cline flute, Carlos Cuestas guitar
- Sleepy Hollow (Austrian Gramophone AG0035), Kathleen Nester & Wendy Stern bass flutes, Katie Leung piano
- Sonata (Three Lakes) (Centaur Records CRC 3525), Patricia Surman flute, Kostas Chardas piano
- Sonatina d'Amore (Crystal Records CD 349), Burl Lane and Susan Nigro contrabassoons
- Sonatine de Giverny (Crystal Records CD 713), Lois Herbine piccolo, Charles Abramovic piano
- Sonatine de Giverny (Talanton TAL 90002, distr. Harmonia Mundi), Gudrun Hinze piccolo, Markus Zügehor piano
- Swans (Austrian Gramophone AG0035), Kathleen Nester & Wendy Stern alto flutes, Katie Leung piano
- The Three Little Pigs (New Focus Recordings FCR108), Auricolae Ensemble
- Three Fun Fables (Bridge Records 92292), Ann Crumb narrator, Rossen Milanov conducting Symphony in C
- Three Little Waltzes (Albany Records TROY 1404), Leonard Garrison flute, Shannon Scott clarinet
- Three Romances (Albany Records TROY 1404), Leonard Garrison flute, Shannon Scott clarinet
- Two Cats (Albany Records TROY 1404), Leonard Garrison flute, Shannon Scott clarinet
- Zoe & Xena: A Romp in the Park (Albany Records TROY 1652), Leonard Garrison piccolo, Shannon Scott bass clarinet
