= Mimi Stillman =

American concert flutist

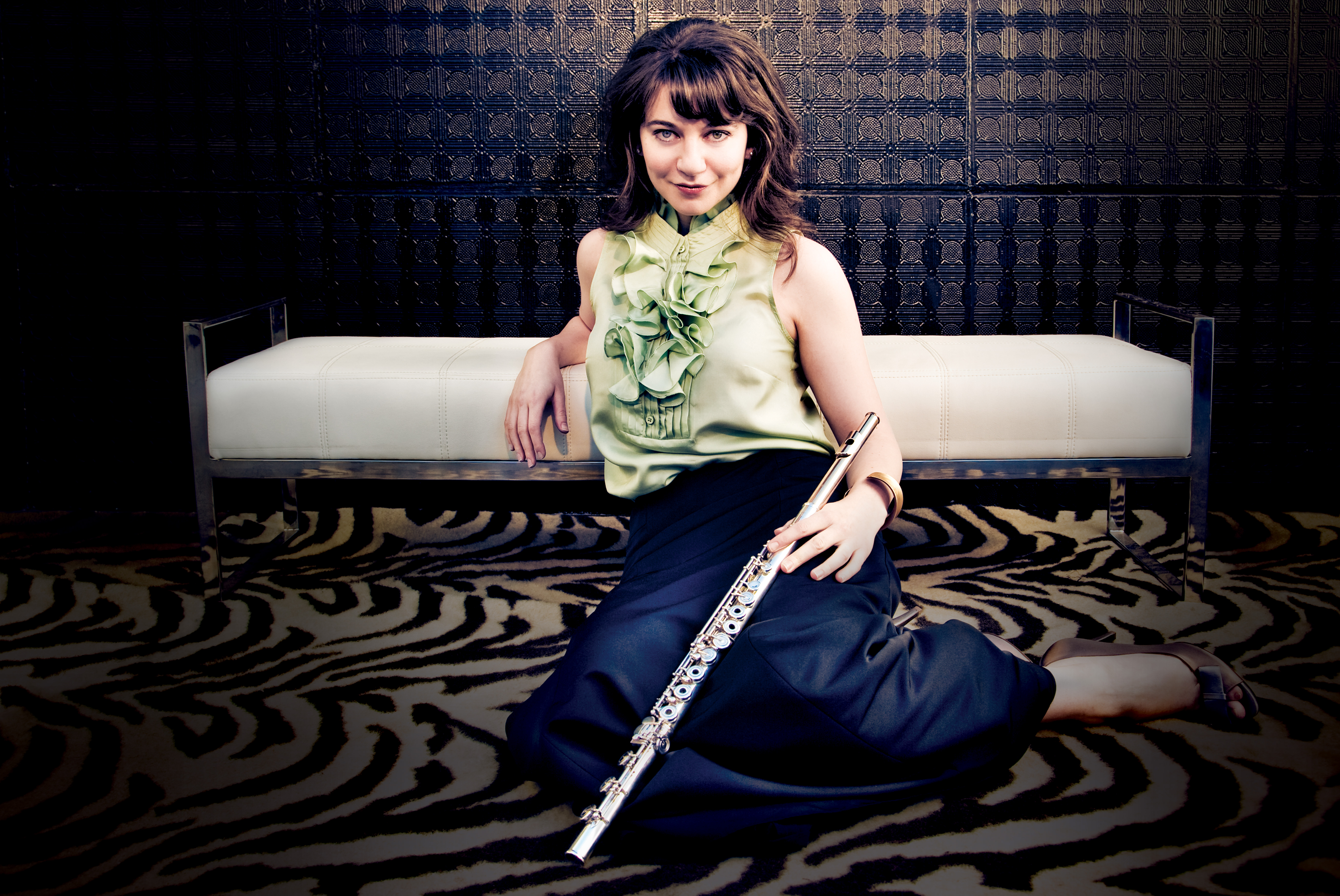
- Mimi Stillman in 2009

Background information
- Born: Boston
- Genres: classical, baroque, jazz
- Occupations: flutist, artistic director, educator
- Instrument: flute
- Works: Dolce Suono Ensemble
- Label: Innova Recordings
- Member of: Sigma Alpha Iota, Flute Society of Greater Philadelphia
- Award: Knight Foundation Arts Challenge
- Website: www.mimistillman.org

Mimi Stillman is a professional international concert flutist and the artistic director of the Dolce Suono Ensemble. She was the youngest flute student ever admitted to the Curtis Institute of Music. She joined the faculty of the Settlement Music School and became the first Shirley and Sid Curtiss Distinguished Faculty Chair for woodwind studies from 2013 to 2015.

== Early life and education ==
Mimi Stillman was born in Boston, Massachusetts. Her mother, Ronni Gordon Stillman, and her brother both played the clarinet. Her mother taught her to play the recorder and to read music by the time she was 5 years old.

She began to play the flute at the age of 6, and went on to study at the preparatory school of the New England Conservatory of Music, where she played in the youth orchestra and other chamber ensembles. At 12 years old, she was the youngest wind player ever admitted to the Curtis Institute of Music, where she studied with Julius Baker and Jeffrey Khaner and obtained her Bachelor of Music degree in 1999. Khaner would later invite her to play as a substitute second flute in Brahm's Requiem with the Philadelphia Orchestra. While a student, she performed with Curtis faculty coaches Richard Woodhams and Donald Montanaro, gaining additional professional experience. While at Curtis, she performed with conductors such as Simon Rattle, Andre Previn, Kurt Masur, among others. Together with fellow Curtis students, composers David Serkin Ludwig and Daniel Kellogg, along with faculty advisor Jennifer Higdon, Stillman formed the first chamber ensemble of her professional music career, with the goal of performing the music of Curtis composers past and present.

Stillman received an Master of Arts in history in 2003 from the University of Pennsylvania and was a Ph.D. candidate there. Her master's thesis explored the influence of Asian music on Claude Debussy and his compositions.

== Career ==
Stillman has performed around the world as a concert flutist. Regarding her performances, the New York Times has described her as "a consummate and charismatic performer" who is also a "scholar [whose] programs tend to activate ear, heart — and brain.”

She has performed in collaboration with pianist Charles Abramovic for over 24 years, as a duo and part of various ensembles and projects. Whether part of a duo, trio, or complete ensemble, her goal has been to expand the flute solo and chamber repertoire by commissioning and premiering new musical compositions by preeminent international composers such as Shulamit Ran, Zhou Tian, Andrea Clearfield and Jennifer Higdon. Her concert programs have also premiered the work of eminent composers such as David Ludwig, Steven Mackey, Richard Danielpour, Steven Stucky, and Mason Bates.

In 2002, composer Zhou Tian wrote the Concerto for Flute and Orchestra specifically for Stillman, and she performed it with the President's Own Marine Chamber Orchestra.

Stillman founded the Dolce Suono Ensemble in Philadelphia in 2005 and remains its executive and artistic director. The ensemble plays a wide range of musical styles, from Baroque compositions to early Jazz, to Latin American world music, and its commissioning program has led to the creation of 71 new works in 20 years. Like a repertory company, it's roster of artists rotates regularly, and along with Stillman, includes artists from the Metropolitan Opera Orchestra, the Philadelphia Orchestra, and a host of professional soloists. The ensemble has performed in its home city of Philadelphia, as well as in New York, Washington D.C., San Diego, Chicago, Baltimore, and other major cities. Some of the ensemble's concert series have been presented with the assistance of grants provided by the Pew Charitable Trusts.

On August 22, 2012, the 150th anniversary of Debussy's birth, she embarked on a project she titled "Syrinx Odyssey," with the goal to record herself playing her solo flute work Syrinx every day for a year, filmed in different locations over 366 days, with each new video performance posted online every day. The project has a dedicated YouTube channel, Syrinx Journey, and Stillman has continued to add Syrinx content to it on a periodic basis.

Since 2017, Stillman has been an instructor at Temple University's Boyer College of Music and Dance. In 2025, she joined The Barnes Foundation as instructor of art and music.

She is an author who focuses on the history and music of France in the 19th and 20th century, with a particular emphasis on the work of Claude Debussy. She has published in journals such as Flute Quarterly and The Flutist Quarterly, and has touched on other professional topics such as how musicians can protect their hearing health.

== Awards ==
Stillman received a Young Concert Artists Audition award in 1999.

In 2012, she received the Women in the Arts award from Women for Greater Philadelphia.

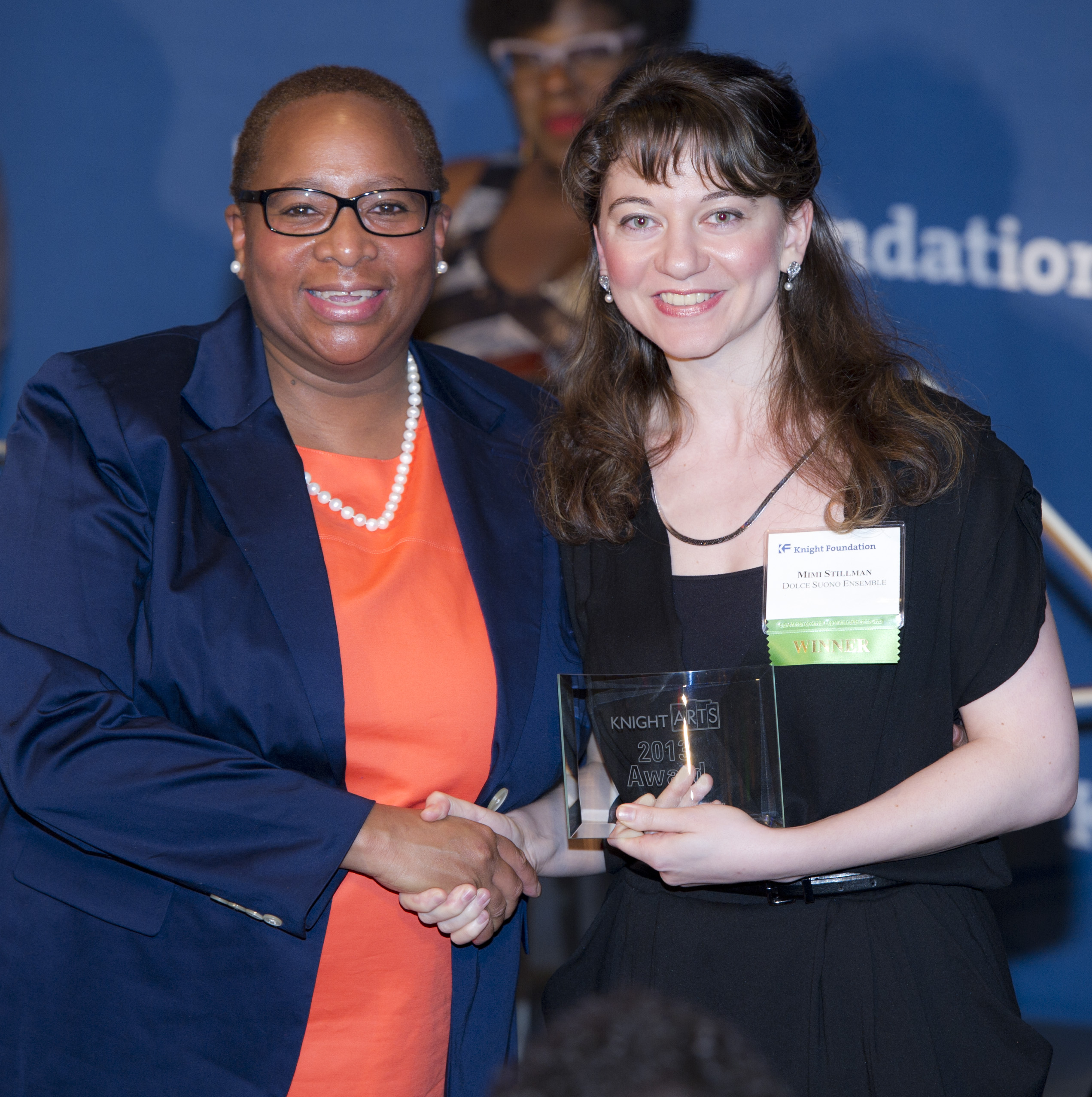
Flutist Mimi Stillman receives a 2013 Knight Foundation Arts Challenge Award

In 2013, Stillman became the first Shirley and Sid Curtiss Distinguished Faculty Chair, chamber music coach, and lead faculty member of the Settlement Music School's Shirley Curtiss Center for Woodwind Studies, where she taught until 2015.

Also in 2013, the Dolce Suono Ensemble won a Knight Foundation Arts Challenge grant for “Música en tus Manos” (“Music in Your Hands”), a musical outreach initiative focusing on the Latino community in Philadelphia. Stillman speaks Spanish and engages with Spanish-speakers at bilingual events where the ensemble introduces chamber music and instruments to the public. Growing up bilingual, and later teaching music to inner-city students on a volunteer basis, Stillman emphasizes that “As a Spanish speaker, I feel a strong connection to Philadelphia’s Latino populations of all backgrounds." The project explores Latin American and Spanish traditional composers such as Juan Crisóstomo Arriaga, Astor Piazzola, Paquito D'Rivera and Alberto Ginastera along with modern composers like Tania León. This project, along with other chamber music series produced by the ensemble have been funded by grants from the William Penn Foundation and the National Endowment for the Arts.

Stillman was inducted as an honorary member in Sigma Alpha Iota in 2014, together with Jennifer Higdon.

== Selected publications ==
Mimi Stillman, Huldah for Solo Flute (2012)

Claude Debussy, Nuits d'étoiles: Eight Early Songs, arr. Mimi Stillman for flute and piano (King of Prussia, Pa., 2002: Theodore Presser).

Mimi Stillman, "Debussy, Painter of Sound and Image", Flute Quarterly (Fall 2007): 41–46.

Mimi Stillman, "The Music of Dante's Purgatorio", Hortulus: The Online Graduate Journal of Medieval Studies 1, no. 1 (2005): 13–21.

Mimi Stillman, "Philadelphia's Changing Opera Landscape", NewMusicBox, 11 June 2012.

Mimi Stillman, "Into the Light: Mieczyslaw Weinberg's Five Pieces for Flute and Piano", The Flutist Quarterly (Winter 2016)

== Selected recordings ==
- Zhou Tian's Concerto for Flute and Orchestra on Aspire: "The President's Own" at 225 - Vol. 2
- American Canvas, Dolce Suono Trio premiere recordings by Jennifer Higdon, Shulamit Ran, Zhou Tian, Andrea Clearfield
- Freedom: Premiere recordings by Richard Danielpour, David Finko, and Mieczyslaw Weinberg. Mimi Stillman, flute and Charles Abramovic, piano, with Yumi Kendall, cello. Innova Recordings, 2015.
- Odyssey: 11 American Premieres for Flute and Piano (2-CD set), Mimi Stillman, flute, Charles Abramovic, piano, 814 (2011).
- The Concertos of David Finko / Mimi Stillman, piccolo, with Orchestra 2001 and James Freeman, conductor. Centaur, 2013.
- Jeremy Gill, Chamber Music, TROY1067.
- Notes: Music from Four Continents, Mimi Stillman, flute, Allen Krantz, guitar. Direct-to-Tape DTR2021 (2012).
- Mimi: Debut Solo Recording with Charles Abramovic, piano. Music by Poulenc, Debussy, premieres by Daniel Dorff and Lawrence Ink, Astor Piazzolla, and Brazilian choros. Dolce Suono, 2004.
- Video recording of George Crumb's "Vox Balaenae" ("Voice of the Whale") for Curtis Performs.
