= Mark Thomas (flutist) =

American flutist and music educator (1931–2022)

- Born: April 24, 1931; Lakeland, Florida, U.S.
- Died: January 24, 2022 (aged 90) Charlotte, North Carolina, U.S.
- Genres: Classical
- Instrument: Flute

Mark Thomas (April 24, 1931 – January 24, 2022) was an American flutist and music educator who studied under William Kincaid. Thomas was also the founder and honorary president of the National Flute Association.

== Early life and education ==
Thomas was born in Lakeland, Florida. He earned a bachelor's degree in flute performance from the Peabody Institute in 1949. After graduating, Thomas enlisted in the United States Army. He was a member of the United States Army Band until 1958.

== Career ==
In 1972, Thomas, along with several other flutists, founded the National Flute Association in Anaheim, California. In 2005, Thomas received the National Flute Association's Distinguished Service Award for his work in founding and helping it develop into an international organization. Thomas has performed at the White House for four presidents and has served on the faculty of American University, the University of North Carolina at Charlotte, the University of Notre Dame, and George Washington University.

== Personal life ==
Thomas died in Charlotte, North Carolina, on January 24, 2022.

== Selected discography ==
- Sounds of Gold (with Christine Croshaw) (Golden Crest Records, 1980)
- Images (with Christine Croshaw) (Golden Crest Records, 1982)
- Contrasts (with Christine Croshaw) (Golden Crest Records, 1983)
