= Donald Peck =

American flutist (1930–2022)

- Born: Born January 26, 1930; Yakima, Washington, United States
- Died: April 29, 2022 (aged 92) Chicago
- Genres: Classical
- Occupations: Flutist, virtuoso, teacher
- Instrument: Flute

Donald Peck (January 26, 1930 in Yakima, Washington – April 29, 2022 in Chicago, United States) was an American flutist. After studying with William Kincaid at the Curtis Institute of Music, Peck spent the early years of his career performing in the National Symphony Orchestra, the United States Marine Band, and as principal flutist of the Kansas City Philharmonic (now the Kansas City Symphony).

In 1957, music director Fritz Reiner invited Peck to join the Chicago Symphony Orchestra as assistant principal flute and a year later promoted him to principal flute, a post he retained until his retirement in 1999. In addition to Reiner, Peck served under music directors Jean Martinon, Georg Solti, and Daniel Barenboim, making over three hundred recordings with the CSO. He appeared as soloist with the orchestra for 123 concerts, including the world premiere on April 18, 1985 of the Flute Concerto by Morton Gould, written for Peck. After his retirement, he recorded several solo CDs and published a memoir, The Right Place, The Right Time! Tales of Chicago Symphony Days.

Donald Peck taught at DePaul University and Roosevelt University and edited many editions of flute music, including the popular collection, Solos for Flute: 36 Repertoire Pieces with Piano Accompaniment. The National Flute Association honored him with its Lifetime Achievement Award in 1997.
