= Ernst Victor Wolff =

German-American pianist, harpsichordist and professor

External audio
- Shellac recordings with Ernst Victor Wolff in the Online Archive of the Österreichische Mediathek

Ernst Victor Wolff (August 6, 1889 – August 21, 1960) was a German-born concert pianist and harpsichordist, who maintained a career not only as a soloist but also as a respected accompanist. Singers with whom he performed included Dorothy Maynor and Alexander Kipnis; he accompanied the latter in the Hugo Wolf Society recording project of the 1930s. As a harpsichordist, on February 20, 1938, he participated in the Carnegie Hall premiere of J.S. Bach's Coffee Cantata under the direction of Walter Damrosch; the other performers on that occasion included singers Charles Kullman, Helen Jepson, and Lawrence Tibbett; flutist Frances Blaisdell; violinists Jascha Heifetz and Sascha Jacobsen; violist Léon Barzin; cellist Gaspar Cassadó; and double bassist Anselme Fortier.

From 1947 until his death, Wolff taught at Michigan State University. His widow and family donated a collection of his papers to the MSU library; it includes photographs and other memorabilia and his diary, student notes, and performing scores. MSU has established an Ernst Victor Wolff Memorial Fund to support awards to meritorious music students. Perhaps his most distinguished student was the American conductor, musicologist, and harpsichordist Alan Curtis.

== Sources ==
- "Michigan State University - Fine Arts Library". 4 September 2007. Archived from the original on 2007-09-04.
- "Scholarship Template". 19 September 2006. Archived from the original on 2006-09-19.
