= William Kincaid (flutist) =

American flautist (1895–1967)

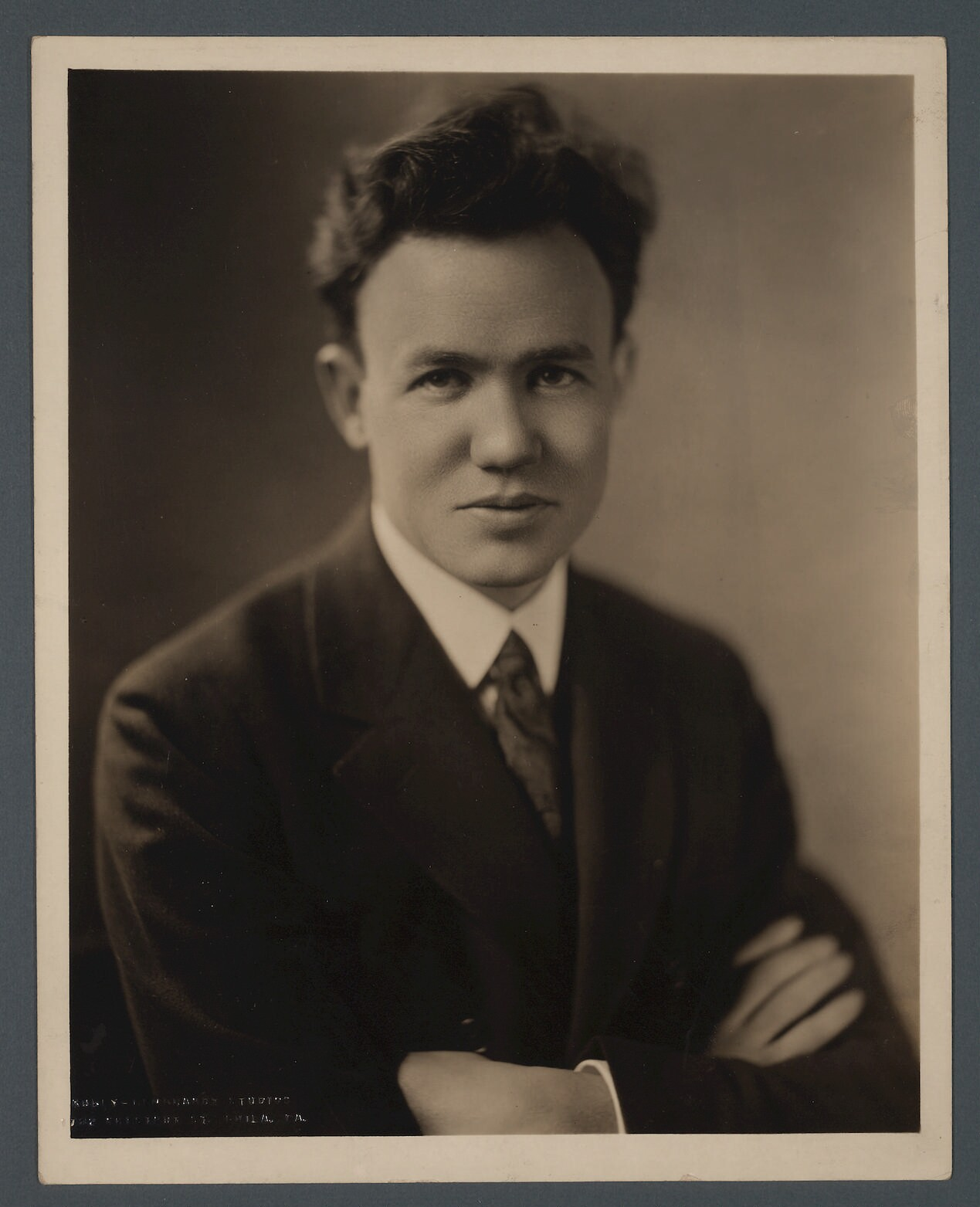
- William Kincaid in 1920
- Born: 26 April 1895; Minneapolis, Minnesota, US
- Died: 27 March 1967 (aged 71); Philadelphia, Pennsylvania, US
- Other name: Monty Kincaid
- Known for: Flute, Teaching
- Movement: American Flute School
- Spouse: Helen Gooding

William Morris Kincaid (26 April 1895 – 27 March 1967) was an American flutist and teacher. He is known for his work as principal flute of the Philadelphia Orchestra for almost 40 years, teaching at the Curtis Institute and being a guiding force in the creation of an American School of flute playing.

== Early life ==
Kincaid was born in Minneapolis on April 26, 1895 but moved at the age of 4 to Honolulu, Hawaii. Here he often enjoyed diving for pennies in the harbor. He was an avid swimmer throughout his life, taught early on by Duke Kahamamoku, where learned the breath control that later served him well as a professional flutist. He began playing the flute at age 8, while simultaneously studying piano.

In 1911, Kincaid moved to New York, enrolling in Columbia University and the (now the Juilliard School), where he studied flute with Georges Barrère. He received diplomas in 1914 and an artist diploma in 1918, and performed in the flute section of the New York Symphony under Walter Damrosch from 1914 to 1919. During this time in New York, Kincaid served as president of the newly created New York Flute Club.

During World War I, Kincaid served briefly in the United States Navy, later rejoining the New York Symphony. In 1920, he played solo flute with the New York Chamber Music Society.

== Philadelphia Orchestra ==
After André Maquarre was dismissed by Leopold Stokowski in April 1921 during a rehearsal, Kincaid was offered the principal flute position in the Philadelphia Orchestra, which he went on to hold for 40 seasons. During his tenure, he appeared as a soloist in 215 performances by the orchestra. He was well-regarded by other musicians in the orchestra.

He retired from the Philadelphia Orchestra in 1960 aged 65.

== Curtis Institute of Music ==
In either 1924 or 1928 (sources vary), Kincaid joined the faculty of the newly established Curtis Institute of Music, where his four decades of teaching would have a profound impact on orchestral flute playing in the United States. At Curtis he collaborated with the pianist Vladimir Sokoloff. Sokoloff's daughter Laurie (with Eleanore Sokoloff, also a teacher at Curtis) was a pupil of William Kincaid. The flutist Julius Baker was also a student of Kincaid's, and went on to teach another generation of flutists at Curtis. It was at the Curtis Institute where Kincaid collaborated with oboist and fellow institute professor Marcel Tabuteau to create a system of groupings called "Curtis Brackets."

== American School of Flute ==
Through his teaching at Curtis and elsewhere, Kincaid is sometimes referred to as the Grandfather of the American Flute School. Through the work of Demetra Fair at the Ohio State University during her dissertation writing, an extensive research study of 4,360 American flutists and their "flute" lineage, it became clear that William Kincaid, George Laurent and Marcel Moyse form the basis of the American Flute School.

== Legacy ==
At least 40 compositions were dedicated to him, and 87% of all professional flutists living in the United States in 2003 could trace their heritage to Kincaid. One such composition dedicated to Kincaid's memory by his students is Aaron Copland's Duo for Flute and Piano.

== Notable students ==
- Julius Baker
- Frances Blaisdell
- Paul Lustig Dunkel
- Doriot Anthony Dwyer
- Joseph Arthur Mariano
- Katherine Hoover
- John C. Krell
- George Ellers Morey
- Donald Peck
- Claire Polin
- Elaine Shaffer
- Maurice Sharp
- Felix Skowronek
- John Solum
- Mark Thomas
- Albert Tipton
- Robert Hugh Willoughby
- Charles Wyatt

== Platinum flute ==
Kincaid's instrument featured a solid platinum body and silver French-style open-hole keys. Originally created for display at the 1939 New York World's Fair, the flute was purchased afterwards by Kincaid. The headjoint sported the Trylon and Perisphere logo, symbol of the 1939 fair, engraved by Verne Q. Powell. The flute was considered so valuable that it remained under armed guard throughout the fair.

Shortly before his death in 1967, Kincaid gifted the flute to his student, Elaine Shaffer. After her own death, the flute was auctioned by Christie's in 1986. The successful bidder was noted chemist, author and art collector Stuart Pivar, who paid $187,000 for the flute. Pivar was accompanied by artist Andy Warhol the day of the auction. For a time the flute was on loan to the Metropolitan Museum of Art in New York City and was considered the most expensive flute in the world, but it was auctioned at Christie's again in 2009 and realized only $37,500. The flute is currently on loan to flutist Brandon Patrick George.

== Recordings (selection) ==
- "Mozart: Concertos for Wind Instruments (Legendary Interpretations)", Philadelphia Orchestra, Ormandy, Sony, ASIN: B0000027J1
- "Music for the flute" William Kincaid with Vladimir Sokoloff (piano) Columbia ML43S9
- "William Kincaid Plays the Flute" "William Kincaid (flute) accompanied by Vladimir Sokoloff". Award Artist Disc No. AAS-705
- "Music for organ and orchestra", POULENC Francis (Francia); BARBER Samuel (USA); STRAUSS Richard (Austria), GARFIELD Bernard (fagotto); KINCAID William (flauto); ORMANDY Eugene (dir); The Philadelphia Orchestra, COLUMBIA-COLU MS 6398
- "Chamber Concerto by George Barati", Performers: Sol Schoenbach (Bassoon), William Kincaid (Flute), Marcel Tabuteau (Oboe), Label: Cri,
- "The Original Philadelphia Woodwind Quintet", Label: Boston Records, Composers: André Jolivet, Jean Françaix, Francis Poulenc, Jacques Ibert
