= Jasmine Choi =

South Korean flutist (born 1983)

Jasmine Choi 최나경
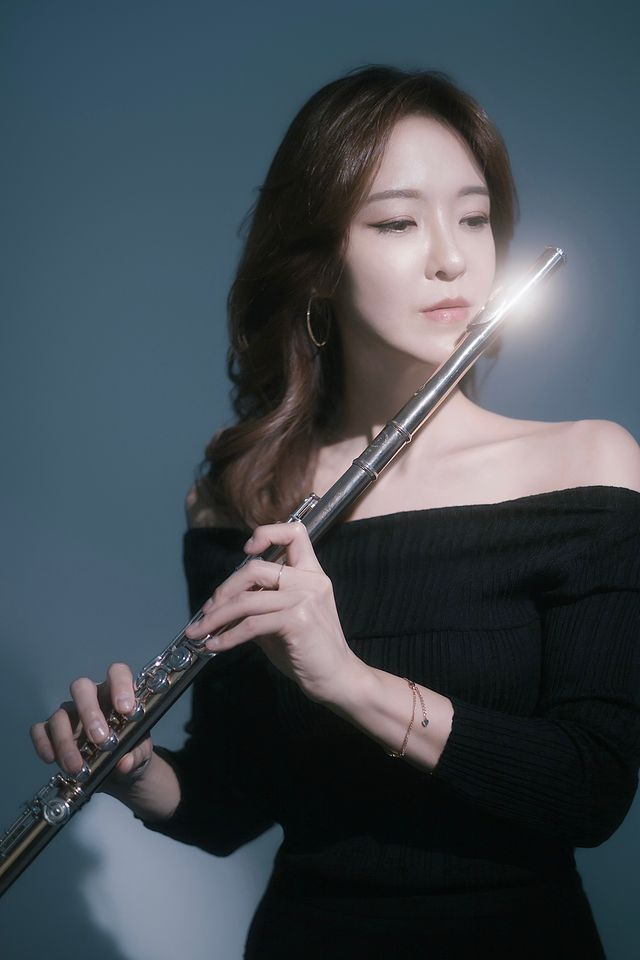
- Jasmine Choi in 2025

Background information
- Born: Seoul, South Korea
- Genres: Classical, Jazz, Pop
- Occupation: Flautist
- Instrument: Flute
- Website: www.jasminechoi.com

Jasmine Choi (Korean name: Choi Na-kyung (Korean: 최나경), born in Seoul, South Korea, May 23, 1983) is a South Korean flautist, who was educated in the U.S. and is currently living in Austria. She currently serves as the cultural ambassador for the Daejeon Culture and Arts Foundation.

== Life ==
Raised in Daejeon, Choi grew up in a musical family, with one of her grandfathers being the founder of the Chung-Joo Philharmonic Orchestra and her mother being a professional violinist. Choi began her musical studies playing the piano and violin at age three, starting the recorder for school in the third grade, eventually starting the flute at age nine. At age twelve, Choi was accepted into an arts school in Seoul. She eventually moved to the United States during high school, going to a school with no music program.

At age sixteen, Choi was accepted into the Curtis Institute of Music, taking part in a program that allowed her to earn her high school diploma while studying there. Choi studied at the Curtis Institute of Music and the Juilliard School, where her teachers included Julius Baker and Jeffrey Khaner, from 2000 to 2004. As a student in 2002, she was the senior division winner of the Albert M. Greenfield Student Competition, sponsored by the Philadelphia Orchestra. In 2006, Symphony Magazine included her as one of two flutists in their list of emerging artists.

In 2016, Choi got married, having met her future husband in 2013.

== Music career ==
A recording of her performances of Mozart's Concerto for Flute and Harp K. 299 and the Concerto for Flute K. 314 (called Jasmine Choi plays Mozart) was released in 2006 in Korea by Sony BMG. She later held the post of associate principal flute of the Cincinnati Symphony Orchestra under Paavo Järvi and principal flute of the Vienna Symphony under Fabio Luisi.

Choi served as principal flute of the Vienna Symphony Orchestra from May 2012 to August 2013, the first Korean-born member of the orchestra in its history. With members of the orchestra, she made a commercial recording of flute quartets by Mozart.

Choi was the 2018 artist-in-residence for the Sejong Arts Center of Seoul. Choi was also the artist-in-residence for the New York Classical Players from 2018 to 2021.

Choi has transcribed the violin concerti of Mendelssohn and Tchaikovsky for flute. She has also transcribed the Introduction and Rondo Capriccioso of Saint-Saens, for flute. In addition, Choi has commercially recorded works of Claude Bolling in 2012 (Sony Classical) and the 12 Fantasies for Solo Flute by Georg Philipp Telemann (Austrian Gramophone). Mark Laycock has written a flute concerto for Choi. Choi has been named as an official cultural ambassador in her hometown Daejon, Korea.

On May 6, 2021, Choi announced on her Twitter and Facebook that she co-created a product alongside Kalb Manufaktur, the SmartCase.

On April 25, 2025, it was announced that Choi had accepted a position at the Indiana University Jacobs School of Music, and as of August 1, 2025, is on the teaching staff as a flute professor.

== Discography ==
Choi's recordings include:

- Naxos - Composer's Notebook, Vol. 2 - From My Bookshelf, Flute Concerto No. 1 in B-Flat Major (version for flute and string orchestra), Jasmine Choi, Kyiv Virtuosi Orchestra, Dmitry Yablonsky (conductor) (2025)
- Love in Paris - a live recital album, Jasmine Choi & Sangwook Park (2017)
- Trio Joy - free improvisations, Jasmine Choi, Joe Fonda, Harvey Sorgen (2017)
- The Telemann Files : 12 Fantasies for Solo Flute, Jasmine Choi (2015)
- W.A.Mozart: 5 Quartets with Flute, Jasmine Choi with members of Vienna Symphony (2013)
- Claude Bolling Suite for Flute and Jazz Trio, Jasmine Choi (2012)
- Fantasy, Jasmine Choi (2011)
- Jasmine Choi Plays Mozart, Jasmine Choi (2006) (only released in Korea)
