= Efrem Kurtz =

Russian conductor (1900–1995)

Efrem Kurtz (photo with dedication)

Efrem Kurtz (Russian: Ефрем Курц; November 7, 1900 – June 27, 1995) was a Russian conductor.

== Life and career ==
Kurtz was born in Saint Petersburg, Russia. He studied at the Saint Petersburg conservatory with Alexander Glazunov and Nikolai Tcherepnin, among others. He then pursued graduate studies at Riga University and the Stern Conservatory in Berlin. He later was a pupil of Arthur Nikisch in Leipzig.

Kurtz made his conducting debut in Berlin in 1921 while a student at the Stern Conservatory when he substituted for an ill Nikisch to accompany the dancer Isadora Duncan on tour. This led to a number of concerts with the Berlin Philharmonic. From 1924 to 1933 he conducted the Stuttgart Philharmonic, and in 1928, Kurtz was engaged by Anna Pavlova to accompany her dancing, which he did until her death in 1931. From 1933 to 1941 he was conductor of the Ballet Russe de Monte Carlo, touring with them extensively. His work in Monte Carlo included conducting the premiere of Gaîté Parisienne.

Kurtz later moved to the United States, and became a citizen of that country in 1944. He was music director of the Kansas City Philharmonic from 1943 to 1948. He held the same post with the Houston Symphony from 1948 to 1954, when his contract was not renewed. Kurtz also conducted a number of film scores, including Jacques Ibert's score for Orson Welles' Macbeth.

From 1955 to 1957, Kurtz was music director of the Royal Liverpool Philharmonic jointly with John Pritchard. Thereafter he took a number of guest conducting posts, including engagements with orchestras in Leningrad and Moscow in the Soviet Union, where he returned for the first time in 1966.

Kurtz was married three times. He divorced his first wife, Katherine, to marry flutist Elaine Shaffer; Shaffer had been the first-chair flute of the Houston Symphony (under Kurtz) until she resigned in 1953 to pursue a successful solo career. The two remained married until her death, of lung cancer at the age of 47, in 1973. After her death, Kurtz married Mary Lynch, who survived him. He died in London, aged 94.

== Recordings ==
His recorded repertoire included works by among others Dmitri Shostakovich (early recordings, though not premieres, of several of the symphonies and the Age of Gold ballet suite), Ernest Bloch (one of whose last works, Two Last Poems (Maybe...) was dedicated to Elaine Shaffer), Heitor Villa-Lobos (his Uirapuru). Many of these recordings were made in the 1940s and 1950s with the Philharmonia in London. He recorded primarily for Columbia Records and EMI.
