= Julius Baker =

American flutist (1915–2003)

- Born: September 23, 1915; Cleveland, Ohio
- Died: August 6, 2003 (aged 87) Danbury, Connecticut
- Genre: Orchestral
- Occupations: Flautist, educator
- Instrument: Flute
- Years active: 1937–2003
- Formerly of: Pittsburgh Symphony Orchestra, Cleveland Orchestra, New York Philharmonic, Chicago Symphony Orchestra
- Website: juliusbaker.com

External audio
- You may hear Julius Baker performing Antonio Vivaldi's Flute-Bassoon Concerto in G Minor with Karl Hoffmann, bassoon and Antonio Janigro conducting Solisti de Zagreb in 1964 Here

Julius Baker (September 23, 1915 – August 6, 2003) was one of the foremost American orchestral flute players and educators. During the course of five decades he concertized with several of America's premier orchestral ensembles including the Chicago Symphony and the New York Philharmonic Orchestra. In addition, he was a faculty member at several premier conservatories of music including; The Juilliard School of Music, the Curtis Institute of Music and Carnegie Mellon University.

== Background ==
Baker was born in Cleveland, Ohio, and at age nine started flute lessons with his Jewish-Russian immigrant father. Later he studied with August Caputo and local flautist Robert Morris. He attended the Eastman School of Music, where he was pupil of Leonardo De Lorenzo, and the Curtis Institute, where he studied with William Kincaid and had classes with Marcel Tabuteau. Upon graduation in 1937, Baker returned to Cleveland to play second flute in the Cleveland Orchestra, conducted by Artur Rodziński, and in the section led by Maurice Sharp. He went on to a distinguished and long tenure as principal flute in the New York Philharmonic.

== Career ==
=== Teaching, performing ===
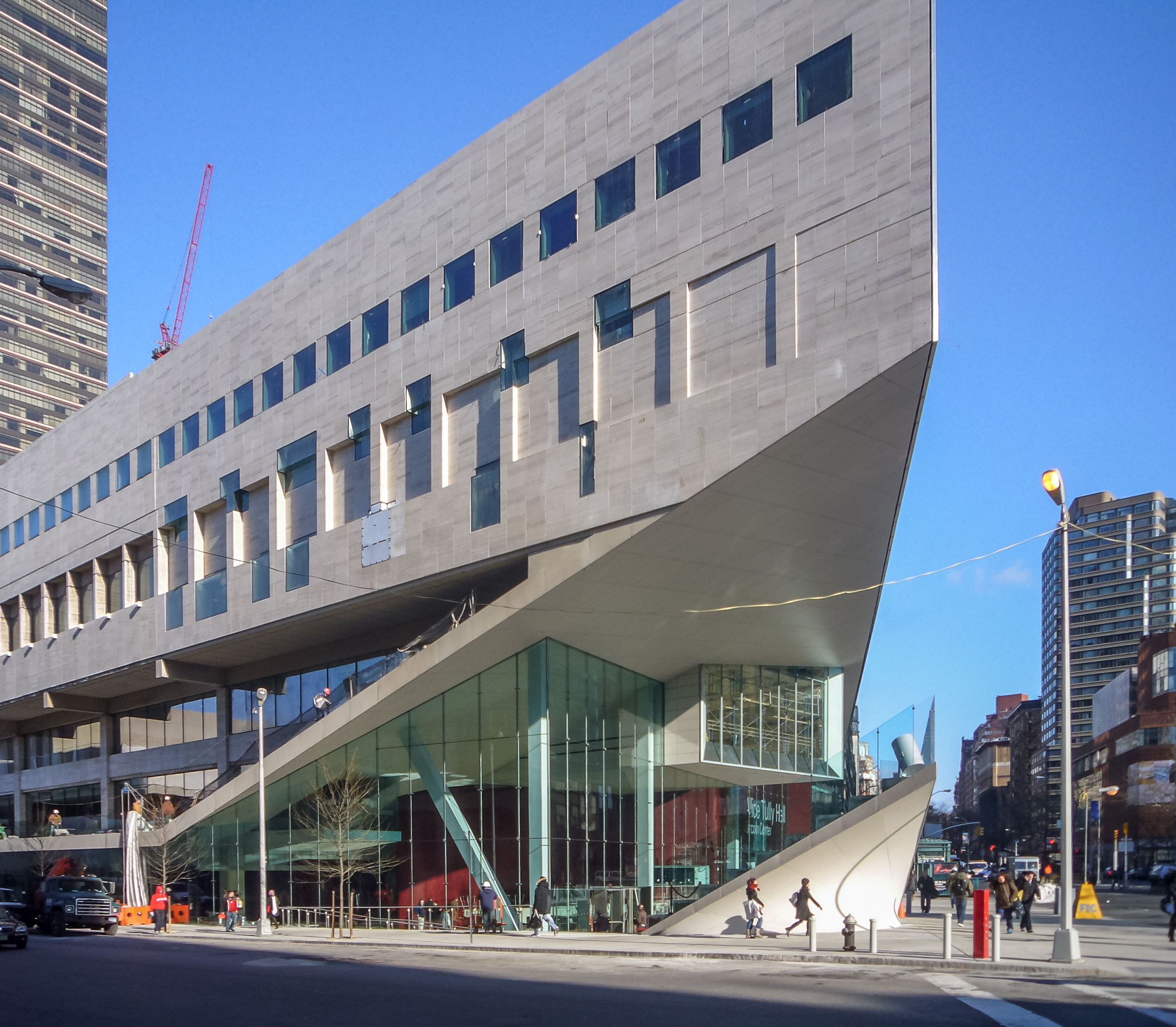
Juilliard School - Alice Tully Hall

Julius Baker was well known as a teacher and served as a faculty member at the Juilliard School from 1954, the Curtis Institute of Music from 1980, and Carnegie Mellon University from 1991. He made many recordings with conductors such as Bruno Walter and Leonard Bernstein, and played second flute with the Cleveland Orchestra from 1937 to 1941.

Baker emerged as principal flautist with the Pittsburgh Symphony Orchestra under Fritz Reiner from 1941 to 1943, the CBS Symphony Orchestra under Alfredo Antonini at the CBS network in New York City (1943–1951), with the Chicago Symphony Orchestra under Rafael Kubelik from 1951 to 1953, and subsequently with the New York Philharmonic for 18 years, beginning in 1965 under such legendary conductors as: Leonard Bernstein, Pierre Boulez and Zubin Mehta. During that time he also played in the Columbia Symphony Orchestra. In 1963, he was a soloist with the Naumburg Orchestral Concerts, in the Naumburg Bandshell, Central Park, in the summer series.

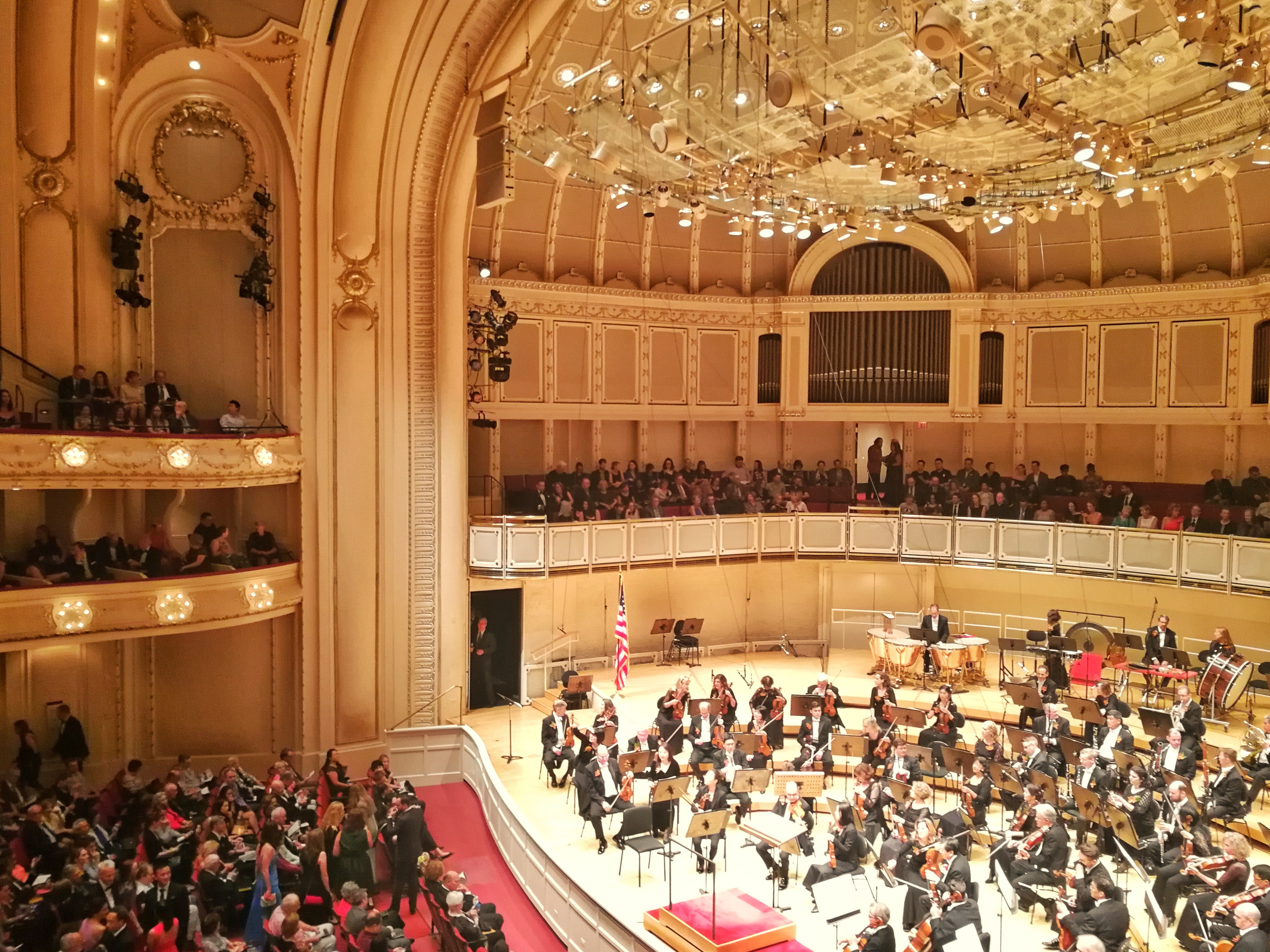
Orchestra Hall at the Symphony Center in Chicago

Baker loved chamber music and was one of the founding members of the Bach Aria Group, with whom he played from 1946 to 1964. Baker also performed on several notable film scores, including The Little Mermaid, Beauty and the Beast and Lovesick. In addition, he appeared opposite violinist Oscar Shumsky in filming Bach's Brandenburg Concerto No. 5, with pianist and conductor Glenn Gould for CBC Television. Baker also collaborated with Glenn Gould, the violinist Rafael Druian and members of the New York Philharmonic in a recording of Johann Sebastian Bach's Brandenberg Concerto No. 4 in G Major, BWV 1049.

In addition to film, Baker was also featured on network television in such noted programs as: The Dick Cavett Show in 1971 and the Public Broadcasting Service series Great Performances in 1995.

External images
- Julius Baker performing with the New York Philharmonic at Avery Fisher Hall (1960s- 1980s); Here On Archives.nyphil.org
- Julius Baker with conductor Zubin Mehta at Teatro Colon in 1978 Here on Gettyimages.com

Baker gave the first American performance with orchestra of the Ibert Flute Concerto in 1948 with the CBS Symphony under the direction of Alfredo Antonini for Voice of America, and that concert was later issued on his own label, Oxford Records. Baker also collaborated with his friend John Serry, Sr. during his tenure at CBS and produced a demonstration recording in 1951 of Mr. Serry's compositions for flute and accordion entitled La Culebra and Desert Rumba, both of which were dedicated to Baker and are archived within the The Julius Baker Music Collection at the Juilliard School of Music.

As the principal flutist in the New York Philharmonic, Baker performed internationally at several premier concert venues. In 1978 he concertized with the New York Philharmonic at the Teatro Colon in Buenos Aires, Argentina under the direction of the conductor Zubin Mehta. Several years later, Baker retired from the New York Philharmonic in 1983 in order to devote himself to playing recitals programs and concertos around the United States, Europe and Asia.

In 1997 and 1999 he was jury member at the International Flute Competition "Leonardo De Lorenzo", held every two years in Viggiano, Italy.

=== The Oxford Recording Company ===
Baker was also an electronics buff and amateur ham radio operator. He built audio equipment upon which he taped his early solo recordings. The Flute Talk article explained, "His interest in electronics developed into The Oxford Recording Company, a mail-order business he ran out of his home and which produced five of his flute recordings between 1946 and 1951.

== Notable pupils ==
External videos
- You may see Julius Baker performing with Glenn Gould in Bach's Brandenburg Concerto No. 5 for the CBC Television documentary "Glenn Gould on Bach" in 1962; Here on bing.com
- Photograph of Julius Baker recording with the Columbia Symphony Orchestra in 1948; Here on Getty Images.co.nz

- Paula Robison, a well-known soloist and chamber musician who is now on the faculty of the New England Conservatory
- Jeffrey Khaner, currently principal flutist of the Philadelphia Orchestra
- Mimi Stillman, soloist, chamber musician, and artistic director of Dolce Suono Ensemble
- Gary Schocker, a flute soloist and composer
- Jeanne Baxtresser, who succeeded him as principal flutist of the New York Philharmonic and recently retired to devote herself to teaching at Carnegie Mellon School of Music
- Jasmine Choi, former principal flutist of the Vienna Symphony
- Valerie Coleman, flutist, composer, and founder of Imani Winds
- Eugenia Zukerman
- Marina Piccinini, international soloist and chamber musician, faculty of Peabody Institute and Hochschule für Musik, Theater und Medien Hannover
- Hubert Laws, Jazz and Classical virtuoso.
- Demarre McGill, principal flutist of the Seattle Symphony
- Viviana Guzman, International Soloist and Professor of Flute at the University of California, Santa Cruz

== Death ==
Julius Baker died in 2003, aged 87.

== Discography ==
External audio
- You may hear Julius Baker performing Claude Debussy's Prelude to the Afternoon of a Faun with Lisa Emenheiser, piano in 1982 Here
- You may hear Julius Baker performing the Allegro from Wolfgang Amadeus Mozart's Concerto for Flute, Harp, and Orchestra K. 299 with Antonio Janigro conducting I Solists de Zagreb Here on archive.org

Serenade In D Major, Op. 25 and Trio In C Minor Op. 9, No. 3 (Decca, 1953)

- Poem For Flute And Orchestra and A Night Piece For Flute And String Quartet (Decca, 1952)
- Eighteenth Century Flute Duets with Jean-Pierre Rampal (1959)
- The Virtuoso Flute with the Vienna State Opera Orchestra (Vanguard, 1967)
- The Art of Julius Baker (Desmar, 1977)
- Julius Baker in Recital (VAI 1993)
- The Virtuoso Flute Vol. 2 (1996)

With Coleman Hawkins

- The Hawk in Hi Fi (RCA Victor, 1956)

== Archive ==
- The Julius Baker Collection at the Juilliard School of Music Peter J. Sharp Special Collections contains Baker's collection of 1,900 published scores and 275 manuscript scores.
