= Claire Polin =

American classical composer

Claire Polin (January 1, 1926 – December 6, 1995) was an American composer of contemporary classical music, musicologist, and flutist.

== Education ==
She obtained three degrees in music from the Philadelphia Conservatory: a Bachelor, Masters and Doctorate in Music. She also studied at the Juilliard School and Tanglewood. Her teachers included Vincent Persichetti, Lukas Foss, Roger Sessions, and Peter Mennin. She also studied flute with William Kincaid, with whom she collaborated on a multi-volume method of flute technique.

== Career ==
Her works were commissioned and performed by the Seoul National Symphony Orchestra, the New York Philharmonia, the Israel Bach Society, and the London Pro Musica Antiqua of Westminster, as well as by William Kincaid, Gordon Gottlieb, and the Gregg Smith Singers.

Polin served on the faculty at Rutgers University, where she taught composition, as well as courses in the music of the Bible, music of ancient Wales, and music of Russia. She also published books on musicological subjects.

== Personal life ==
She is survived by two sons, Josef and Gabriel Schaff, and one grandchild.

== List of works ==
Note: This is not a complete list. In some cases, the dates listed may have been the original publication date as opposed to the year it was written. Many pieces were published several times in new editions.

=== Compositions ===
- Sonata No. 1 for Flute 1959
- Symphony in two movements 1960
- No-Rai: Songs from Korea, 1963? Soprano Voice, Flute, Double Bass
- Sonata for Flute and Harp 1964/73
- No Man is an Island, SATB chorus, piano, 196_
- Serpentine: Lyrical instances for solo viola and imaginary dancer, 1965
- Structures for Solo Flute 1965
- Consecutivo: Study on a Requiem, 1966
- Summer Settings, harp, 1967
- Makimono, flute, clarinet, violin, violoncello, piano, 1969
- Second Sonata for flute and harp (From the Painter’s Brush), 197x
- Music for the Prince of Wales: Hen ganiadau gwanwyn, medium high voice (male or female) with cello accompaniment
- Cader Idris: Landscape for Brass Quintet, 1971
- Infinito: A Requiem, alto sax, soprano solo, narrator, SATB chorus, 1972
- Out of childhood; variations on Russian-Turkish folksongs for piano, 1972
- Margóä for solo flute, 1972
- O, Aderyn Pur, Flute, Alto Sax, Tape, or flute solo 1972
- The Death of Procris: Studies After a Painting by Piero di Cosimo, 1972-73 Flute and Tuba
- Telemannicon: Solo obe flute, canonically played with tape or live, 1974
- Second Symphony, 1974
- Journey of Owain Madoc: Symphonic Meditations on the Discovery of America, 1974
- Scenes from Gilgamesh, flute and string orchestra, 1974
- Makimono II: for brass quintet, 1975
- Laissez sonner for solo piano, 1976
- Pièce d’encore: for solo viola (or violin), 1976
- Synaulia II, flute(alto fl), clar(bass clar), piano, 1976
- Paraselene: Dark nebulae I: Book of Songs for Soprano, Flute, and Piano, 1976/77
- A klockwork diurnal, alto sax, French horn, bassoon, 1977
- Amphion: for symphony orchestra, 1977
- Wind Songs for soprano and guitar, 1978?
- Vigniatures: Variations for Violin and Harp, 1979
- Felína, Felína, violin, harp, 1980
- Res naturae: The Carmarthan dove in a mialiseet dance, woodwind quintet, 1980
- Dark nebulae II: Ma’a lot, viola and percussion, 1981
- Georgics: After Virgil for Solo Flute, 1981
- Mythos: Concerto for Harp and String Orchestra, 1982
- Kuequenaku-Cambiola, percussion and piano, 1983
- Phantasmagoria, piano 4 hands, 1985
- Freltic Sonata for Violin and Piano, 1985
- Shirildang: trans-Ural Suite for piano, 1991
- Walum olum, clarinet, viola, piano

=== Publications ===
- Music of the ancient Near East, 1974 Greenwood Press (Westport, CT)
- "Why Minimalism Now?" Music and the Politics of Culture, ed. Christopher Norris, pp. 226–239, London: Lawrence & Wishart 1989
- "Interviews with Soviet Composers", Tempo 1984 151, 10-16 Cambridge University Press
- “The Composer as Seer, but not Prophet” Tempo Combridge 1994 Issue 190, p13-18
- New York: Women in Music and Soviet Contemporaries. Tempo 174, 1990 p32,34,36-37
- The Ap Huw manuscript. 1982 Henryville, PA: Institute of Mediaeval Musicological Studies. (Vol 34?)
- “Observations on the Ap Huw manuscript. Music & Letters 60(3) 1979, 296-304: Oxford University Press.
- A Possible Provenance for parts of the Ap Huw manuscript. Welsh Music, 1985.
- The Ap Huw Manuscript. Music & Letters 62(1): 120, 1981
- Moscow Festival Diary. Tempo 1984 No. 150 p. 35-38
- Ancient Semitic Music: A study starting in earliest times and ending circa 500 BC (1950)
- A Treasury of Jewish Folksong. Ethnomusicology 9(2). 191-193 (1965)
- Gifts of Jubal; musical instruments from the ancient East. Philadelphia, PA: University Museum Press
