= Frances Blaisdell =

American flautist

Frances Blaisdell (January 5, 1912 – March 11, 2009) was an American flautist, widely recognized as one of the first female professional flautists. She held positions with the National Orchestral Association, the New Opera Company and the New Friends of Music. In addition, she was the first woman to appear as a soloist and wind player in concert with the New York Philharmonic. In addition to playing, she also held teaching positions at the Manhattan School of Music, New York University, Dalcroze School, Mannes School of Music, and Stanford University where she taught for over 35 years. Blaisdell's teachers included Georges Barrère, Marcel Moyse and William Kincaid.

== Biography ==
Blaisdell was born in Tennessee on January 5, 1912, and was raised on a farm in Red Bank, New Jersey. She attended Red Bank Regional High School. She began studying the piccolo and flute at age 5 with her father, who was in the lumber business but loved playing the flute. Later, her father wrote to Ernest Wagner, then with the New York Philharmonic, asking him to teach "my Jim" flute lessons. He initially refused upon finding out she was actually a female, but was later persuaded to give her lessons.

In 1928, Blaisdell wrote to Georges Barrère at the Institute of Music Art (what is now the Juilliard School of Music) requesting an audition. The secretary at the Institute had recorded her name as "Francis" rather than Frances, and thus the Institute was expecting a male flutist to audition. At the time, the Institute did not accept female wind instrument players because the institution would "'lose its investment.'" Nonetheless, Blaisdell was still able to play the audition for Barrère, and performed the Cecile Chaminade Concertino. Barrère offered her admission on the spot, even if it required a full scholarship. She won the concerto competition at Juilliard while studying there. During the summer of 1932, she spent the summer studying with Marcel Moyse in France. The following December, she was asked at the last minute to substitute for a New York Philharmonic children's concert, where she played Mozart's Concerto in D-major, K. 314 and became the first female soloist with the Philharmonic. She would later study with American flutist William Kincaid, then principal flute of the Philadelphia Orchestra.

Blaisdell realized early on that she could not support herself with solely an orchestral career, so she built a multifaceted career as a soloist, chamber musician and educator in addition to holding several orchestral positions. In the 1930s she was first flute of the National Orchestral Association, New Opera Company, New York City Ballet and the New Friends of Music. In 1935, she appeared as a soloist at Radio City Music Hall in a special set written for her alongside the Rockettes. Additionally, she performed under the baton of Leopold Stokowski at the opening of the Juilliard School in New York City.

After being refused an audition for assistant principal of the New York Philharmonic in 1937 because of her sex, she became the first female wind player to perform with the Philharmonic in 1962, on a piece that required additional flutes. In 1941, she replaced Barrère in the Barrère Trio after her former teacher suffered a stroke, cementing her place in the flute tradition as his protege. Blaisdell also performed with regional, vaudeville and commercial ensembles, including appearances at Madison Square Garden, on Broadway, with the Gordon Quartet at the Library of Congress, at Radio City Music Hall, and on Hour of Charm with Phil Spitalny and His All-Girl Orchestra on CBS and NBC radio. She performed New York premieres of Ruth Crawford Seeger's Suite and Ernest Bloch's Suite Modale.

While in New York she held teaching positions at the Manhattan School of Music, New York University, Dalcroze School, and Mannes School of Music. Additionally, she performed or collaborated with chamber ensembles such as the Gordon Quartet, Blaisdell Woodwind Quintet, Blaisdell Trio, Bach Circle, and soloists soprano Lily Pons, harpist Mildred Dilling, harpsichordist Ernst Victor Wolff, and composer Henry Hadley. The Blaisdell Quintet was composed of Blaisdell on flute, Bruno Labate on oboe, Alexander Williams on clarinet, Benjamin Kohon on bassoon, and Richard Moore on horn. This group frequently performed on NBC and CBS Radio from 1938-1941. In 1953, she performed with the Naumburg Orchestral Concerts, in the Naumburg Bandshell, Central Park, in the summer series.

In 1973, she and her husband moved to California where she accepted an interim position at Stanford University, which ultimately lasted for 35 years. She is credited with teaching in the French tradition of flute playing to generations of American flutists while at Stanford and positions in New York. Her tone was characterized as, "full and [with the] musical phrasing of the French School with her own vigorous rhythmic interpretation and an individual use of tone color." Blaisdell also held summer masterclasses, where she reached even more aspiring flutists.

She also served on the executive board of the National Flute Association, who named her an honorary member in 1992 and awarded her their Lifetime Achievement Award in 1994. The New York Flute Club held an 80th birthday celebration for Blaisdell in 1992, where internationally renowned flutist and pedagogue Jean-Pierre Rampal made a surprise appearance to introduce her. In 2006, she received the Lloyd W. Dinkelspiel Award for Excellence in Undergraduate Education from Stanford University. She continued to teach until two months before her death on March 11, 2009, in Portola Valley, California. She was 97. Scholarships have been established in her name at Stanford University and the National Flute Association.

Chamber Music Magazine wrote in a 1992 article that "Every woman flute player in every major American orchestra, every little girl who plays the flute in a school band, has Frances Blaisdell to thank. She was the first."

== Personal life ==
She met and married Alexander Williams in 1937. He was the first clarinetist of the New York Philharmonic and principal clarinet of the NBC Symphony. Together, they formed the Blaisdell Woodwind Quintet (with the aforementioned members from the Philharmonic) and the Blaisdell Trio. The couple have two children together, son John and daughter Alexandra Hawley, also a flutist and lecturer at Stanford University. Her daughter studied with Jean-Pierre Rampal.

== Commercial Recording ==
Blaisdell is heard on the 1960 Golden Crest LP No. 4020 recording, "The Flutist's Showcase: The Artley Flute Quintet," along with Murray Panitz, Frederick Wilkins, Harry Moskevitz, and James Pellerite.
