= John Solum =

American flutist, author and educator (b.1935)

John Solum (born 1935, Wisconsin) is an American musician, author, educator, and advocate for the arts.

== Professional career ==
=== Early years ===
Settling in New York City in 1958, John Solum launched an international solo and chamber music career. Notable concert appearances include recitals at the Queen Elizabeth Hall in London, the Frick Collection in New York, and the Library of Congress in Washington, D.C. In 1962 he was the first flutist to be soloist at the newly inaugurated Lincoln Center in New York. He performed at the White House in Washington in 1970 for a presidential state dinner honoring the Prime Minister of Great Britain. In 1973 he toured the United States, Bermuda and Canada under Columbia Artists Management as guest soloist with the English Sinfonia. In 1983 he became the first American flutist to give recitals in the Soviet Union. He has been featured at music festivals including Mostly Mozart at Lincoln Center, Vermont Mozart, Oregon Bach, Aston Magna, Music Mountain, Montreux, Haslemere, and the Menuhin Festival in Gstaad, Switzerland. He has appeared with chamber music groups at festivals.

Solum was co-founder of the Connecticut Early Music Festival, serving as artistic director for 17 years. In England he founded the Bath Summer School of Baroque Music, which he directed for ten years. He has edited editions of music for Oxford University Press, the publishers of his book, The Early Flute.

=== Discography ===
Solum's discography includes over 100 works for flute and reflects his interest in both modern and historical instruments. On historical flutes his solo recordings include the Mozart Flute Concertos (EMI) and the Bach Flute Sonatas (Arabesque). On modern flute his recordings for EMI include the concertos of Ibert, Jolivet, Honegger and, with the Philharmonia Orchestra, the two Malcolm Arnold Flute Concertos as well as an album of six Romantic works for solo flute and orchestra. In 2001 he began making a series of recordings for MSR Classics with the Hanoverian Ensemble, a period-instrument group. In 2007 he collaborated with Vanessa, Lynn and Corin Redgrave on a benefit recording for Broadway Cares and The Actors Fund.

More than 20 composers have written works for him. Aaron Copland wrote his "Duo for Flute and Piano" in response to Solum's request to compose a work in memory of his teacher William Kincaid.

He has served on review panels for the National Endowment for the Arts and the New Hampshire Arts Council. For six years he was treasurer of the National Flute Association and is a past president of the New York Flute Club. He has been a visiting professor at Oberlin College Conservatory of Music, at Indiana University, and a lecturer at Vassar College.

=== Other activities ===
Solum has had a lifelong interest in the visual arts. In 1994 he began championing the work of the pioneering American modernist artist, James Daugherty (1887–1974). Solum's initiatives have led to exhibitions of Daugherty's art, lectures, television documentaries, articles, and the recovery and restoration of ten of his large-scale murals, including four in Cleveland's State Theater at Playhouse Square and six New Deal murals in Greenwich, Stamford, and Darien, Connecticut.
