= Jeffrey Khaner =

Canadian flutist (born 1958)

- Born: December 22, 1958 (age 67); Montreal, Quebec, Canada
- Occupation: Flute professor
- Instrument: Flute

Jeffrey Khaner (born December 22, 1958) is the principal flutist of the Philadelphia Orchestra. He has also served as principal flutist with the Cleveland Orchestra and the Pittsburgh Symphony. Khaner teaches at the Curtis Institute of Music, The Juilliard School, and the Lynn University Conservatory of Music. In September 2012, he launched the Online Classical Flute School with Jeffrey Khaner through ArtistWorks.

== Career ==
Canadian-born flutist Khaner has been principal flute of The Philadelphia Orchestra since 1990. From 1982 to 1990 he was principal flute of the Cleveland Orchestra, and he has also served as principal of the New York Mostly Mozart Festival (1981–82) and the Atlantic Symphony in Halifax (1980–81), and as co-principal of the Pittsburgh Symphony (1981–82). A noted soloist, Khaner has performed concertos with orchestras throughout the United States, Canada, and Asia, collaborating with conductors including Riccardo Chailly, Christoph von Dohnányi, Charles Dutoit, Christoph Eschenbach, Claus Peter Flor, Hans Werner Henze, Vladimir Jurowski, Erich Leinsdorf, Kurt Masur, Yannick Nézet-Séguin, Yutaka Sado, Wolfgang Sawallisch, Gerard Schwarz, José Serebrier, Robert Spano, Franz Welser-Möst, and David Zinman. Khaner's concerto repertoire is extensive and he has premiered many works including the concertos by Ned Rorem, Behzad Ranjbaran, Jonathan Leshnoff, Eric Sessler and David Chesky, all written for him. As a recitalist, Mr. Khaner has appeared on four continents with pianists Charles Abramovic, Christoph Eschenbach, Lowell Liebermann, Wolfgang Sawallisch, Hugh Sung, and many others. He regularly incorporates into the programs the music of today's composers, many of whom have written expressly for him.

Khaner is a founding member of the Syrinx Trio with former Philadelphia Orchestra Principal Viola Roberto Díaz and Philadelphia Orchestra Principal Harp Elizabeth Hainen, which made its Carnegie Hall debut in 2001 at Weill Recital Hall.

A graduate of the Juilliard School, Khaner was named to the faculty as flute professor in 2004, holding the position formerly held by his mentor, the late Julius Baker. Since 1985 he has been a faculty member of the Curtis Institute of Music in Philadelphia. He is also Professor of Flute at Lynn University in Boca Raton, Florida. He has given master classes throughout North, South, and Central America, Europe, and Asia. Khaner has also participated as a performer and teacher at many summer festivals and seminars including the Solti Orchestral Project at Carnegie Hall, the New World Symphony, the Pacific Music and the Hamamatsu festivals in Japan, the Sarasota and Grand Teton festivals, and the Lake Placid Institute. In 1995 he was selected by Sir Georg Solti to be principal flute of the World Orchestra for Peace, celebrating the 50th anniversary of the United Nations. The orchestra regularly reconvenes in venues throughout the world. He is also the principal of the Mainly Mozart Festival in San Diego, California.

In addition to his orchestral recordings, Khaner has extensively recorded solo flute repertoire. He has released seven critically acclaimed solo CDs on the Avie label – American, British, Czech, French, German, and Romantic Flute Music, and Brahms and Schumann sonatas and romances. His recording of David Chesky's Concerto for Flute and Orchestra, appears on Chesky Records and his recording of Ned Rorem's concerto is on Naxos. His editions of repertoire, including the Brahms sonatas, are published by the Theodore Presser Company. He is a Yamaha performing artist and clinician.
