= National Flute Association =

US Nonprofit

The National Flute Association
- Abbreviation: NFA
- Formation: 1972
- Founder: Mark Thomas (1972-2022)
- Founded at: Indiana
- Type: Nonprofit
- Purpose: Inspiring Flutists, Enriching Lives.
- Headquarters: 70 East Lake Street, Chicago, Illinois, USA
- Location: USA
- Members: 5,000
- Executive Director: Jennifer Clarke
- Staff: 8 staff, 14 Board of Directors
- Website: https://www.nfaonline.org/

The National Flute Association (NFA) is an organization of flute players with roughly 5,000 members from more than 50 countries. It is an association in the United States with headquarters in Chicago, Illinois.

The organization was founded in 1972 by flutist Mark Thomas and incorporated in 1973 in Indiana. The first administrative role was established in 1977. Past presidents, program chairs, and committee chairs have included principal flautists of American orchestras, soloists, chamber musicians, and professors at conservatories & universities. Notable members include Sir James Galway and Ian Anderson. Jennifer Grim is President of the Board for 2024–2026, with Francesca Arnone serving vice-president for 2024–2026.

On the Executive Staff, Jennifer Clarke was named the executive director in January 2021.

== Founding board ==
In 1973, an ad-hoc committee was created to help plan a convention of flutists. The group became the members of the first Board of Directors.

== Annual conventions ==
The NFA Convention is the largest annual flute convention in the world, with more than 3,000 attendees and 80 exhibitors each year. The four-day event includes numerous workshops, masterclasses, competitions, and performances from flute players based all around the world. Conventions are held in cities across the United States. The very first convention was held in 1973 located in Anaheim, California with around 77 attendees. Due to the COVID-19 pandemic in 2020, the convention that was supposed to be held in Dallas, Texas was instead held virtually, the first time there was no in-person convention since its conception. 2020's virtual convention marked the return of convention titles, affectionately dubbed the "Summer Series", and was an extended length from the usual four days in August to "a month and a half of dynamic, interactive programming for flutists around the world. While it can't replace the convention, the Summer Series is an opportunity for more of us than ever to connect through our shared love of flute.". The following year, 2021, was also virtual, but the length was returned to the typical four day convention. The In-Person Convention returned in 2022 in Chicago, Illinois, celebrating the 50th Anniversary of the NFA.

The first NFA convention was held at the Royal Inn in Anaheim, California on August 10, 1973.

== Committees ==
NFA members have established committees that focus on individual components of the organization and the concerns of the wider flute community, including highlighting less prominent areas of flute musicianship, such as low and Baroque flute, reaching out to underserved communities, and providing pedagogical guidance, among other initiatives. These committees helped establish the NFA's music commission program, create scholarships and competitions, and collect pedagogical materials aimed at young flutists.

== Competitions ==
NFA competitions create opportunities for a variety of flautists from different skill levels and styles to compete, gain performance skills and audition experience. The Annual NFA Convention currently hosts 22 performance competitions in solo, flute choir, and masterclass categories. There are 18 performance competitions to select outstanding flutists to perform at the NFA convention. There are also four non-performance competitions, which highlight new flute music, research, and entrepreneurship.

== Commissions ==
The NFA commissions original compositions for all members of the flute family. The New Music Advisory Committee, established in 1985, works with the NFA Board to create opportunities for flutists to interact with contemporary composers by playing their music and ensuring today's composers create substantial repertoire for flute players.

The NFA has commissioned more than 70 new works for both flute and piccolo. Beginning in 1986, the NFA has commissioned a new piece to be used as repertoire in the Young Artist Competition each year. In 1989 a yearly commission for a new work for the High School Soloist Competition was added. The NFA also commissions a piece for the bi-annual Piccolo Artist Competition, as well as special project commissions. Composers include winners of the Pulitzer Prize, Prix de Rome, and other awards.

== Scholarships ==
The NFA has established numerous scholarship programs for continuing education, including cultural outreach scholarships in 15 U.S. and non-U.S. cities. The NFA supports promising students with several scholarships named after flutists whose involvement in the organization helped shape its vision:

The annual Frances Blaisdell Scholarship, named for Frances Blaisdell, provides a U.S. high school or undergraduate student with the opportunity to receive complimentary registration for that year's convention and take advantage of the many performances, workshops, and sessions being offered.

Every other year, the NFA offers the Myrna Brown Scholarship, which allows an international student to attend and present at the Annual Convention.

The NFA also offers several scholarship prizes at the convention.

The Geoffrey Gilbert Scholarship prize is awarded to the NFA High School Soloist Competition first-place winner for further flute study with any teacher who is a member of the NFA.

The Deveau Scholarship is awarded for the outstanding performance of the NFA High School Soloist Competition commissioned work.

== Awards ==
Since 1991 the National Flute Association has honored the best and the brightest of its colleagues with the Lifetime Achievement Award. The debut award went to Jean-Pierre Rampal. Other notable recipients include Julius Baker and Sir James Galway. The NFA also gives out the Distinguished Service Award, first given to John Solum in 1998.

== The NFA Library ==
The NFA Library was established in 1973 when exhibiting publishers at the first convention were asked to donate copies of their music. The NFA holds the largest lending library of flute music internationally, with a catalog of more than 15,000 works, many of which are rare or out of print. The library is located at the University of Arizona Fine Arts Library in Tucson, Arizona.

== Publications ==
NFA members create ongoing publications to communicate with the flute world and share valuable research, history, educational, and pedagogical resources.

The NFA's member magazine, The Flutist Quarterly, is published each season and includes contributions from members, flute scholars, and other enthusiasts from around the world. The NFA also produces special publications, including The Flutist’s Handbook, Kindcaidiana, and historic recordings.
