= San Antonio Grand Opera Festival =

The San Antonio Grand Opera Festival (sometimes referred to as the San Antonio Opera Festival or just the San Antonio Opera) was an annual opera festival presented by the San Antonio Symphony from 1945 to 1983.

The festival presented four operas over two consecutive weekends each spring with leading international opera stars in the principal roles. Notable singers to have performed at the festival include Rose Bampton, Muriel Costa-Greenspon, Margaret Harshaw, Brenda Lewis, Mildred Miller, Beverly Sills, Joan Sutherland, Norman Treigle, Richard Tucker, and Frances Yeend among others. Initially the festival was housed at the San Antonio Municipal Auditorium which sat 5,000 people, but in 1968 the festival moved to the newly built Theatre for the Performing Arts (which would later be renamed the Lila Cockrell Theatre).

Conductor Max Reiter, who envisioned the festival, served as Artistic Director from 1945 until his death in 1950. Victor Alessandro then took the helm, and continued to run the festival successfully until his death in 1976. After the death of Alessandro, the festival floundered under the leadership of first François H. Huybrechts (1978–1980) and then Lawrence Leighton Smith (1980–1983). Facing financial losses, the San Antonio Symphony ceased presenting the festival after 1983.
