= Children's Chorus of San Antonio =

Children's choir in San Antonio, Texas

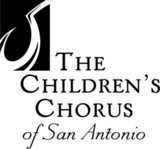

Background information
- Origin: San Antonio, Texas, United States
- Years active: 1983-present
- Website: www.childrenschorussa.org

In 1983, Marguerite McCormick founded the Children’s Chorus of San Antonio. The organization runs eight core ensembles, one of which is in special collaboration with the Boys and Girls Clubs, as well as an extensive early-childhood music and movement program for babies and toddlers called Music Together.

== History ==
The CCSA was founded in 1983 by Marguerite McCormick. Originally known as the UTSA Children's Chorus, the chorus operated with only 33 singers. As the program grew, it eventually split off and the Children's Chorus of San Antonio was officially created as an independent musical non-profit organization in 1993.

Marguerite McCormick served as the artistic director of the chorus until 2017. In April 2017, she was succeeded by Ryan Garrison, a choral arts teacher at the Arizona School for the Arts. In 2019, Dr. Gary Mabry stepped up as Interim Artistic Director, following Garrison. In 2022, Dr. Carolyn Cruse brought her passion for music to the Children's Chorus, becoming the new Artistic Director.

In 2014, CCSA became a resident affiliate of the Tobin Center for the Performing Arts, moving the majority of its performances into the Tobin Center.

== Programs ==
CCSA’s programs are divided into three divisions: Beginning, Intermediate, and Advanced Ensembles

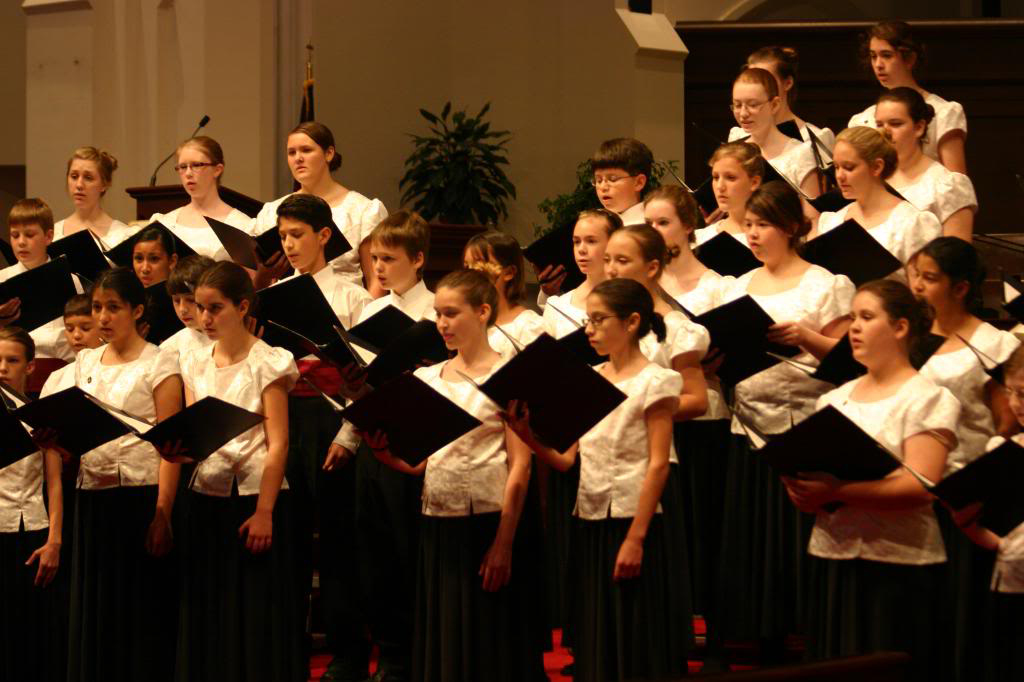
Performing at the annual Spring Song concert in 2008.

=== Core Ensembles ===
CCSA's core ensembles provide a rigorous curriculum of performance-based instruction ranging from the basics of vocal technique through an extensive and diverse repertoire. These ensembles are divided into Beginning, Intermediate, and Advanced level ensembles- accommodating a wide range of ages and skill levels. Placement hearings are held annually for both returning and new singers.

Preparatory and Prelude ensembles are Beginning Level ensembles, providing an introductory choral experience for ages 5–8.

Chorale and Choristers are Intermediate Level ensembles, providing choral experience for ages 9–13. Chorale is the primary ensemble for ages 9–13. This ensemble is for growing and beginner singers. Choristers offers more challenging repertoire for singers with previous choral experience, ages 11–13.

There are three ensembles at the Advanced Level for ages 14–18; Concert Choir, Chamber Mixed, Chamber Tenor-Bass, and Encore. Concert Choir is a larger treble ensemble of singers with previous choral experience. The Chamber Mixed ensemble is a full SATB-mixed choral experience, meeting one day/week for 90-minutes. The Chamber Tenor-Bass ensemble is primarily made up of advanced changed male voices, also meeting one day/week for 90-minutes. Encore is CCSA's premiere advanced treble ensemble. Singers in Encore are also required to provide leadership within CCSA's Concert Choir. All four choral groups require placement by audition.

=== Neighborhood Choirs ===
In 2014, CCSA created the Neighborhood Choirs division as a community outreach program. Neighborhood Choirs are year-round programs for students in grades 3-8, guiding them to sing, work as a team and find their voice both musically and individually. Now in partnership with the Boys and Girls Clubs, Neighborhood Choirs are tuition-free. Students receive similar curriculum and instruction as comparable levels of core ensembles. Neighborhood Choirs meet once per week for one hour during the academic year. These choirs also offer summer camps for 2 hours, once per day for a three-week intensive camp during the summer. Neighborhood Choir students perform at the Tobin Center for the Performing Arts in the H-E-B Hall twice a year; summer students receive a similar experience with a concert in the Alvarez Theater.

=== Music Together ===
Music Together is a nationally recognized early childhood program that encourages natural enthusiasm for music and movement in infants, toddlers, and young children birth to age 4. Parents, grandparents, and caregivers are present at each class. Through this program, children and their accompanying adults share songs, rhymes, movement and instrument play in a non-performance-oriented environment. Music Together with CCSA offers Mixed Age classes for babies and toddlers 18 months old through age 4, and a Babies-only class. These classes occur throughout the week.

Music Together with CCSA runs classes seasonally. During the Fall, Winter, and Spring seasons, classes are available in ten-week long sessions. During the Summer season, classes are available for six-week long sessions. Free demo classes are also available.

== Recordings ==
- Purcell’s Dido & Aeneas (1998)
- Alamo City Sings (1999)
- Voicerenity – Children’s Lullabies (2002)
- The Children’s Chorus of San Antonio 20th Anniversary Concerts (2005)

== Commissions/Performances ==
Founder Marguerite McCormick and CCSA have championed new music for children’s choirs by commissioning numerous works including the Scarecrow Pieces by Joan Whittemore in May 1999, jointly commissioned by UTSA and CCSA, The Present by UTSA professor Dr. James Balentine received its premiere in October 2003. Composer David L Brunner was in residence with CCSA choirs in May 2005 for the premiere of his piece, Then, Now, Forever, commissioned in memory of Tour Director Robert E. “Bob” McCormick. 2007 saw the world premiere of Annunciation by Kevin McCormick and in May, 2009 the chorus gave the San Antonio premiere Like a Singing Bird by Bob Chilcott.

In addition to presenting its own concert series, CCSA regularly sings with the San Antonio Symphony and San Antonio Mastersingers, and has performed alongside the Texas Bach Choir, the UTSA Choirs and Orchestra and the United States Air Force Band and Singing Sergeants. CCSA has also been featured in the San Antonio Festival, the San Antonio Early Music Festival, Musica San Antonio and the San Antonio Founders Day Celebration.

CCSA has traveled state and nationwide to places such as Victoria, New Orleans, Oklahoma City, Princeton, and New York City. They have been featured in performances at music education and choral conferences such as the Texas Music Educators Association (TMEA), Texas Choral Directors Association (TCDA), and American Choral Directors Association (ACDA). The chorus is known globally as well, having collaborated with children’s choirs from the Czech Republic and Germany. CCSA has participated in national and international concert tours. These tours have taken the Advanced Ensembles to east- and west-coast North American destinations and to Europe, including England, Scotland, Denmark, Italy, and France.

The chorus has performed in venues including:

- The U.S. Air Force Academy Chapel
- Carnegie Hall
- The Alamo
- The International Festival-Institute at Round Top, Texas
- The Cathedral Church of Saint John the Divine, New York
- The Cathédral of Notre Dame, Paris
- St. Peter's Basilica, Rome
- The Chapel of the Incarnate Word
- Other performances include a fully staged Baroque opera production of Purcell’s Dido and Aeneas in 1998 and on-air features with NBC-TV’s Today Show and NPR’s Performance Today.

== See also ==
- Youth Orchestras of San Antonio
