= List of compositions by Katherine Hoover =

List of Katherine Hoover's known compositions

Katherine Hoover focused her career as a contemporary classical music composer through her flute. Thus, the initial lists below are conveniently categorized by her compositions for flute. Subsequent lists classify her chamber music by instrumentation. While some compositions are well-documented with readily available citations, others may require further research and exploration at Eastman School of Music's Sibley Library. Katherine Hoover's working papers, manuscripts, books and research materials have been gifted to Sibley's Special Collections.

To maintain precision, the sources for composition titles and manuscript dates encompass reputable references, such as ASCAP, the International Confederation of Societies of Authors and Composers, and Papagena Press. It's essential to note that a composer's manuscript date may precede the copyright date, and the use and application of copyrights have evolved over the course of Katherine Hoover's lifetime.

The reliability of the citations is ensured through reference to sources including the United States Copyright Office's, "Music Licensing U.S. Copyright Office" and "Card Browser"; additionally, the Library of Congress, and WorldCat.

Notation generally adheres the IMSLP: Abbreviations for Instruments.

== Flute ==
=== Flute, solo ===
Title(date)	Scoring	Cite	Notes
Cadenzas to Mozart concerto in G, K. 314 (1982)	fl	USCO	(00:05:00) Unaccompanied flute. Cadenzas to Wolfgang Amadeus Mozart concerto in G, K. 314: arranged for flute by composer.
Reflections (1982)	fl	USCO WorldCat	(00:06:00) Unaccompanied flute. Commissioned as a Performing Residency at Artpark in Lewiston, New York (near Niagara Falls). Variations on ancient Norwegian Olavs-fest in Nidaros. The numerical designation of this musical work is Op.25.
Cadenzas to Mozart concerto in G, K. 313 (1984)	fl	USCO	(00:05:00) Unaccompanied flute. Cadenzas to Wolfgang Amadeus Mozart concerto in G, K. 313: arranged for flute by composer.
Kokopeli (1990)	fl	USCO LCCN WorldCat	(00:04:30) Unaccompanied flute. Inspired by "Kokopeli, ... a legendary hero of the Hopi...said to have led the migrations through the Southwest, the sound of his flute echoing through the great canyons and cliffs...[trying to capture] the Hopi's deep kinship with this land." Kokopeli NFA Newly Published Music Award, 1991.
Winter Spirits (1997)	fl	USCO LCCN WorldCat	(00:05:00) Unaccompanied flute. Premiered by Jeffrey Khaner, NFA Convention, 1997. Inspired by a picture by the marvelous artist Maria Buchfink of a Native American flute player; from his flute rises a cloud of kachinas and totem spirits.
To Greet The Sun (2004)	fl	USCO WorldCat	(00:06:00) Unaccompanied flute. Premiered by Alexa Still, NFA Convention 2005. Inspired by the thought that to Greet The Sun is to give thanks for Earth's gift of life as various cultures have done through the millennia.
Etudes (2011)	fl	WorldCat	Unaccompanied flute. Performed by Mark Sparks, NFA convention, 2015. Inspired by the belief that etudes for flute should be challenging yet enjoyable and musically apt.
Spirit Flight (2012)	fl	WorldCat	(00:06:00) Unaccompanied flute. Written for Wendela van Swol of Cordoba, Spain, and premiered at Maranatakerk, The Hague, Netherlands, December 2013. Inspired by Native American sounds and wooden flutes. "[this work was title when] ...played for 2 friends. One [listener, a Lakota] described vivid images of varied landscapes as if flying; the other... [commented, this imagery is a ...]."

=== Flute, duo ===
Title(date)	Scoring	Cite	Notes
Lente et vote (1977)	2fl	USCO	Unaccompanied flute duet. Full title is "Lente et vote; two duets for flutes."
Suite for Two Flutes (1981)	2fl	USCO LCCN WorldCat	(00:08:00) Unaccompanied flute duet. Composed between 1977 and 1981, five short movements explores motifs: melodic, virtuosic, mysterious, and playful. The numerical designation of this musical work is Op.17.
Duo - Six duets for two flutes (1982)	2fl	USCO LCCN WorldCat	(00:06:00) Unaccompanied flute duet. Alternate titles include: Duo for 2 flutes, Six Simple Duets, Six Duets for flutes, Duo, Duo for two flutes. The numerical designation of this musical work is Op.23.
Sound Bytes (1990)	2fl	USCO WorldCat	(00:11:00) Unaccompanied flute duet. Dedicated to Thomas Nyfenger. Premiered by the composer and Bonita Boyd at the NFA Convention, Aug. 24, 1991. Movements: Get up; Thirds; Short circuit or Minimalist interruptus; Invention; Johnny Two-Note; In flight; The numerical designation of this musical work is Op.43.
Antics (2002)	2fl	USCO WorldCat	(00:06:00) Unaccompanied flute duet. Premiered by composer and Don Bailey, NFA convention, 2002.

=== Flute, trio/octet/choir/ensemble/orchestra ===
Title(date)	Scoring	Cite	Notes
Trio for flutes (1974)	3fl	USCO WorldCat	(00:08:00) Flute trio. Composed to demonstrate various effects and sonorities, and different ways of combining the voices, also including a musical palindrome. Movements: Allegro; Andante; Vivo; Largo; Allegro molto; The numerical designation of this musical work is Op.6.
Echo song (1977)	6fl 2afl	USCO WorldCat	Flute octet. Music Orlando di Lasso, with new music & arrangement by composer.
Three for Eight (1996)	fl/picc 2-6fl[C] afl	USCO WorldCat	(00:08:15) Flute ensemble. Commissioned by and dedicated to the New York Flute Club and the Long Island Flute Club. Premiered at the NFA convention, 1996. Movements: Dunes; Sandpipers; Kites
Kyrie (1998)	picc fl/picc 7fl[C] 3afl (org/bell/chim)	USCO LCCN WorldCat	(00:08:00) Flute ensemble. Commissioned by and premiered by Tucson Flute Club, NFA Convention, 1998. Inspired by the Gregorian chant "Kyrie fons bonitatis" as found in the Liber Usualis.
Mariposas (2001)	2fl/picc[solo] 2fl[solo] 2fl/picc 4fl 2afl	USCO WorldCat	(00:08:00) Flute orchestra. Written for Pamela Youngblood. Premiered at the NFA convention, 2001. Inspiration is loosely based on the eclosion (emergence) and flights of butterflies.
Celebration, Sonata in E (2001)	fl[ens]	USCO WorldCat	(00:06:00) Flute ensemble. Celebrating Joseph Mariano's 90th birthday. Based on Bach's Sonata in E; some preexisting text. Composers program note: "In Celebration, I have quoted some of the pieces that I studied under Joseph's tutelage, as well as others that have become part of our heritage as flutists".
Peace Is the Way (2004)	6fl 2afl	WorldCat	(00:07:00) Flute octet. In reaction to the USA's 2003 invasion of Iraq with inspiration from an A. J. Muste quote. Originally written in 2003 for treble chorus; arranged for 8 flutes in 2004; Copyright date on the score: 2003.
Concertante "Dragon Court" (2006)	[solo]:2fl fl/picc [choir]:afl bfl 15fl (cbfl)	USCO LCCN WorldCat	(00:18:00) Flute choir. Commissioned by the Brannen-Cooper Fund and Bickford Brannen. Dedicated to the memory of Frayda Osten. Premiered May 2007, in Nashua, New Hampshire, under the direction of Dr. Eileen Yarrison.

=== Flute with piano ===
Title(date)	Scoring	Cite	Notes
The Medieval Suite: flute & piano (1979)	fl pf	USCO LCCN WorldCat	(00:19:00) Flute and piano duo. Premiered by Christina Smith with Reno Symphony with R. Daniels, conducting, November 1989. Inspired by Barbara Tuchman's A Distant Mirror:The Calamitous Fourteenth Century. Vireli uses parts of work by Guillaume de Machaut. Composed for fl, orch in 1979. NFA Newly Published Music Award, 1987. Movements: Depouillement: Virelai; The Black Knight; The Drunken Friar; On the Betrothal of Princess Isabelle of France, Aged Six Years; Demon's Dance; The numerical designation of the original musical work is Op.18.
Masks (1998)	fl pf	USCO LCCN WorldCat	(00:15:00) Flute and piano duo. Commissioned by the National Flute Association. Premiered by Jeani Foster and Stefanie Jacob, NFA Convention, 1998. Dedicated to Albert Cooper. Inspired by the idea of Masks; they generally make an impression quickly; its effect clear at a glance. Movements: Haida Indian mask; Huichol Jaguar mask; Afro-American Death mask; Clown mask; (andante)
Two Pieces (Fauré) (2002)	2fl pf	WorldCat	(00:15:00) Flute and piano trio. Originally composed for 4 hands piano, by Gabriel Urbain Fauré, arranged for modern flute and piano by composer. Le Pas Espano premiered by composer and Don Bailey, NFA convention, 2007. Movements: Le Jardin de Dolly; Le Pas Espanol; The numerical designation for this work is Op.56.
Three Sketches (2003)	picc pf	USCO WorldCat	(00:08:00) Piccolo and piano duo. Commissioned by National Flute Association Flute Association. Movements: Dusk; Hide and seek; Danza
Two for Two (2006)	afl/bfl pf	WorldCat	(00:09:00) Flute and piano duet. Commissioned by and premiered by Christine Potter in Salt Lake City, 2006. NFA Newly Published Music Award, 2006. Movements: What goes around; Tango
Mountain & Mesa (2008)	fl pf	LCCN WorldCat	(00:12:00) Flute and piano duo. Premiered by Mimi Stillman and Jeremy Gill, NFA Convention, 2009. Inspiration for the second movement is a Hopi Lullaby notated by Natalie Curtis at Third Mesa prior to 1905. Musical work referred to in Eastman School of Music's "Alumni Notes." Movements: Hungarian lassu; On the mesa; Dizi dance
Four winds (2013)	fl pf	WorldCat	(00:10:00) Flute solo with piano. Originally for flute and orchestra; Copyright from the score: 2013. Arranged for Flute and piano 2015. Premiered 2015 by Mark Sparks at the NFA Convention in Washington, D.C. Movements: East; South; West; North

=== Flute in mixed ensembles ===
Title(date)	Scoring	Cite	Notes
Divertimento (1975)	fl str[trio]	USCO LCCN WorldCat	(00:11:39) Mixed quartet. Recorded by Leonarda Productions in the Recital Hall, Penn State University, December, 1979 with members of The Alard String Quartet(1954 to 1994) [Leonard Feldman, Raymond Page, Joanne Zagst] and with Diane Gold. Movements: Allegro giocoso; Adagio-Vivace; The numerical designation of this musical work is Op.8.
Two Dances (1976)	fl ob gtr	USCO WorldCat	Mixed trio.
Nocturne Fantasy (1977)	fl hp str[orch]	LCCN WorldCat	(00:06:00) Flute and harp concerto. The numerical designation of this musical work is Op.13.
Lyric Trio (1983)	fl vc pf	USCO WorldCat	(00:18:00) Mixed trio. Written for the Huntingdon Trio. NFA Newly Published Music Award, 1994. The numerical designation of this musical work is Op.27.
Canyon Echoes (1991)	fl gtr	USCO WorldCat	(00:11:59) Flute and guitar mixed duet. Written for and premiered by Duologue at the Walker Art Center in Minneapolis Minnesota in 1991. Inspired by Michael Lacapa's book The Flute Player which retells the folktale of two young Apache who first meet at a Hoop Dance. NFA Newly Published Music Award, 1993. Movements: Dance; Serenade; She mourns; He returns
Dances and Variations (1995)	fl hp	USCO WorldCat	(00:20:00) Mixed duet. Commissioned by Dr. & Mrs. James P. Carey and Marshall University. Premiered by Wendell Dobbs and Larry Odom at the Kennedy Center, 1996. Dedicated to Wendell and Linda Dobbs. Subject of Emmy winning PBS Documentary, Deborah Novak's New Music. Movements: Entrata; Adagio; Variations, My days have been so wondrous free; My days have been so wondrous free is written by Francis Hopkinson, to a poem by Thomas Parnell.
Caprice (1999)	fl gtr	LCCN WorldCat	(00:04:00) Flute and guitar mixed duet. Commissioned by Red Cedar Chamber Music. Premiered by Jan Boland and John Dowdall at the Cedar Rapids Museum of Art, 2000. Inspired by James Michael Smith's painting Red Event.
Quito Suite (2000)	fl bn pf/gtr		(00:18:00) Stand alone title for Dizi dance, 3rd mvmt. Mountain and Mesa.
Two Preludes (2012)	fl mar/vib	WorldCat	(00:10:00) Commissioned by Zara Lawler and Paul Fadoul. Premiered at a tribute concert to composer, sponsored by the New York Flute Club at the Lighthouse in NYC, March 2013. Movements: uptown (flute and marimba); out of town (flute and vibraphone)
Canyon Shadows (2019)	fl fl[native_american] perc	USCO	(00:16:00) Mixed trio. Posthumously edited by Joanne Lazzaro. Original manuscript by composer, 1997. Inspired with visions of a band of ancient inhabitants and their journey finding a new home in the Grand Canyon. NFA Newly Published Music Award, co-winner, 2020. Movements: Searching - 03:08; Moving In - 02:54; Echo - 02:21; Celebration - 03:54; Dusk - 02:46

== Woodwind ==
=== Woodwind, duo/quartet/quintet ===
Title(date)	Scoring	Cite	Notes
Homage To Bartok (1975)	ww[quintet]	USCO LCCN WorldCat	(00:16:30) Wind Quintet. Dedicated to the Dorian Quintet the Sylvan Winds Quintet and many others. Inspired by the many marvelous aspects of Béla Bartók's compositions. Movements: Allegro agutato; Arioso; Vivace
Sinfonia (1976)	bn[quartet]	USCO LCCN WorldCat	(00:11:00) Bassoon Quartet. Written for and first recorded by the New York Bassoon Quartet. The Funeral March was inspired by a scene from Verdi's opera Stiffelio. Movements: Introduction; Funeral march; Allegro vivace.; The numerical designation of this musical work is Op.10.
Suite for Winds (1977)	fl ob cl[B-flat] bn	USCO	Woodwind Quartet. Based on five short piano works by Wolfgang Amadeus Mozart, arrangements for woodwind quartet by composer.
Set for Clarinet (1978)	2cl[B-flat]	USCO LCCN WorldCat	(00:05:00) Clarinet duet. Movements: Fanfare; Air; Dance; The numerical designation of this musical work is Op.15.
Suite for Saxophones (1980)	sax[SATB]	USCO WorldCat	(00:12:00) Saxophone choir. Written for and Recorded by the New York Saxophone Quartet. Inspirations include jazz, big bands, rock and a train trip made to London England. 'Ira's Tune' is an arrangement of a friends pop tune. Movements; Going to London; Count off; Ira's tune; Honk.; The numerical designation of this musical work is Op.20.
Qwindtet (1987)	ww[quintet]	USCO WorldCat	(00:16:00) Woodwind quintet. Commissioned by philanthropist Peter Alexander, The Hudson Valley Wind Quintet and the State University of New York at New Paltz. Dedicated to the Hudson Valley Wind Quintet. Movements; Prelude; Lullaby; Interlude; Dirge; Finale
Five pieces: for wind quintet. (1989)	ww[quintet]	USCO	Woodwind quintet. Piano pieces by Robert Schumann arranged for wind quintet by composer.

=== Woodwind with piano ===
Title(date)	Scoring	Cite	Notes
Aria (1985)	bn pf	WorldCat	(00:04:00) Bassoon and piano duo. Originally for clarinet and string quartet written in 1982. Arranged for any string, woodwind, bassoon, cello, and piano in 1985. The numerical designation of this musical work is Op.31.
Clarinet Concerto (1987)	cl pf	USCO LCCN WorldCat	(00:22:00) Clarinet with piano. Originally for orchestra; piano solo added. Premiered by Eddie Daniels with the Santa Fe Symphony. Elegy, is dedicated to the composer's mother-in-law and close friend, Lee Goodwin. Movements: Allegro; Elegy; Allegro vivace; The numerical designation of this musical work is Op.38.
Ritual (1989)	cl pf	USCO WorldCat	(00:08:00) Clarinet and piano duo. Commissioned by N.Y.S. Music Teacher's Assoc. Premiered October 1989. Influenced by Greek folk music featuring a clarinet solo as a virtuoso instrument.
Sonata, for oboe & piano (1991)	ob pf	USCO WorldCat	(00:16:00) Oboe and piano duo. Written for and Premiered by the Vinland Duo at the Weill Recital Hall, NY. Incorporates a quote from Samuel Barber's composition "Cave of the Heart".
Journey (2009)	bn pf	LCCN WorldCat	(00:16:00) Bassoon and piano duet. Commissioned by a consortium of 31 bassoonists organized by Peter Kolkay. Premiered by Peter Kolkay and Alexandra Nguyen at Teatro National, Panama City. Dedicated to Peter Kolkay.
Shoes For Two Clarinets And Piano (2010)	2cl pf		Duo for clarinets and piano. Premiered by Stanley and Naomi Drucker, and Marilyn Sherman-Lehman, at the Park Avenue United Methodist Church, New York.
Ayres (2011)	ssax pf	WorldCat	(00:07:00) Soprano saxophone and piano duo. Commissioned by James Forger and Christopher Creviston. Premiered 2012 at the Workshop for Music Performance Concert Hall, New York, by Christopher Creviston and Hannah Gruber. Inspired by the beautiful vocal quality of a soprano saxophone played in the Cathedral as well as the extended phrases and haunting melodies of Elizabethan lute music as styled by John Dowland. Based upon three Elizabethan lute songs by English Renaissance composer by John Dowland. Movements: Can she excuse my wrongs; Weep no more sad fountains; Fine knacks for ladies

== Strings ==
=== Strings, solo/quartet/orchestra ===
Composition	Instrumentation	Citation(s)	Notes
Double concerto (1989)	2vn str[orch]	USCO WorldCat	(00:14:00) Concerto for two violins with string orchestra. Commissioned by Southeast Kansas Symphony conducted by Carol Ann Martin. Premiered by Yfrah Neaman and Paul Carlson with the Southeast Kansas Symphony in Pittsburg, Kansas in 1989.
String Quartet (1998)	2vn va vc	USCO WorldCat	(00:22:00) String Quartet. Written for and performed by The Colorado String Quartet. The third movement inspired by a Hopi lullaby. Movements: Moderato 6:19; Vivace 3:47; Adagio (Hopi Lullaby) 6:10; Allegro molto 5:53
String Quartet No.2 (2004)	2vn va vc	LCCN WorldCat	(00:23:00) String Quartet. Written for and performed by The Colorado String Quartet at Rockford College in 2006. Movements: Adagio 4:36; Allegro 5:13; 1/4 = 60 5:36; Allegro 7:29
In Memoriam, Ravi Shankar (2012)	vn	WorldCat	Unaccompanied violin. Composers program note: "A tribute to the great sitar player Ravi Shankar, composed shortly after his passing. The music uses Shankar's concept of additive rhythms."

=== Strings, with piano ===
Title(date)	Scoring	Cite	Notes
Trio(1978) (1978)	vn vc pf	USCO LCCN WorldCat	(00:18:00) Piano trio. Selected for the Kennedy-Friedheim competition in both 1978 and 1979. The numerical designation of this musical work is Op.14.
Aria and Allegro giocoso (1985)	vc[solo] pf	USCO WorldCat	(00:07:00) Cello solo accompanied by piano. For small chamber ensembles, 2 to 4 players, a solo instrument with piano, solo string with piano, solo woodwind with piano. The numerical designation of this musical work is Op.32.
Quintet "Da pacem" (1988)	str[quartet] pf	USCO LCCN WorldCat	(00:25:00) Quintet for piano and string quartet. Commissioned by The New Jersey Chamber Music Society & Peter Alexander. Premiered by The New Jersey Chamber Music Society, Alice Tully Hall, Lincoln Center Plaza, NY, May 20, 1989. Incorporates a canon by Christoph Demantius (1567–1643).
Stitch-Te Naku (1994)	vc pf orch	USCO WorldCat	(00:18:00) Chamber ensemble. Written for Sharon Robinson. Premiered by Sharon Robinson and the Rohnert Park Chamber Orchestra, N. Washburn conducting in 1996, at the Orchestra's inaugural concert in Rohnert Park, CA. Inspired by SW Indian creation story, "Spider Grandmother".
Shadows (2001)	va pf	WorldCat	Mixed duet. In Memorium 9/11. Premiered by Marka Gustavsson & Lisa Moore, at Bard 2009.
El Andalus (2003)	va/vc pf	USCO WorldCat	(00:15:00) String solo with piano. Commissioned by AZ Friends of Music for Sharon Robinson, Premiered in 2004. Inspired by Robinson's request to envision the Andalusian area of Spain and it's confluence Muslim, Christian and Jewish cultures as a center of tolerance and light.
Dancing: violin & piano (2014)	vn pf	WorldCat	(00:11:20) Violin solo with piano. Commissioned by and dedicated to Julie Rosenfeld. Premiered by Julie Rosenfeld and Peter Miyamoto in Columbia, MO, April 2016. Inspired by a 1972 quote from Ezra Pound: "Music begins to atrophy when it departs to far from the dance; poetry begins to atrophy when it gets to far from music." Movements: Arabesque; Cortège; Stomp

== Piano, solo/duo ==
Title(date)	Scoring	Cite	Notes
Pieces for piano (1977)	pf	USCO WorldCat	(00:19:00) Piano solo. Related titles: Four pieces for piano, Three pieces for piano, and Piano book. Movements: Three plus three; Forest Bird; Dream; Chase; Lament; Allegro molto; Poem
Piano Book (1982)	pf		Piano solo. Has relationship with Pieces for piano initiated in 1975 and completed in 1983. Seven pieces. The numerical designation of this musical work is Op.19.
Three Movements for Piano (1982)	pf	USCO	Piano solo. Alt. Title: Movements for piano.
Allegro & Andante espressivo (1983)	pf	USCO WorldCat	(00:03:00) Alternate title: Andante & Allegro. Movements: Allegro; Andante; The numerical designation of this musical work is Op.28.
Five Pieces for piano (1989?)	pf		Piano solo. Alternate titles include: Suite of keyboard works, Lyric pieces. Movements: Children's Party; Foreboding; Lullaby; Novelette; Why
At The Piano (2003)	pf	USCO WorldCat	(00:06:00) Piano solo. Movements: In circles; Melody; Permission; Mice; Not a waltz; Good night
Preludes for piano (2004)	pf	USCO WorldCat	(00:16:00) Piano solo. Movements: Declamation; Orchid; Scherzo; Stringing beads; Lento; Melody; Skedaddle
Collage (2006)	2pf		Piano duo. Original katherinehoover.com citations references 4 movements.
Dream Dances (2008)	pf	WorldCat	(00:08:00) Piano solo. Premiered by Dianne Frazer at the 'Festival of the Hamptons' in 2008. Performed by pianist Miriam Conti at New York's Tenri Hall in 2009, presented by the Leschetitzky Association. Based upon weaving varied dances together. Musical work noted, Eastman School of Music's "Alumni Notes."
Thin Ice (2009)	pf	WorldCat	(00:10:00) Piano solo. International Premiere by Gloria Chuang at the Hong Kong Institute of Education in Hong Kong April 14, 2010. United States Premiere by Mirian Conti at St. Peters Church, NYC April 20, 2010. Based upon the fear of tumbling through thin ice into cold and darkness, alternatively taking a chance, considering the disdain and shock of others yet forging ahead.
Line Drawings (2007)	pf	WorldCat	(00:11:03) Solo piano. Premiered by Mirian Conti at the Bohemians Club in 2009. Recorded May 2008, at Patrych Sound Studios, NYC. Based on work by Saul Steinberg for David Dubal. Movements: The line; War zone; Don Quixote stalks a pineapple
Passacaglia & Romp (2008)	2pf		Piano duo. Commissioned by Pianofest premiered 2009. Premiered at Pianofest by Yohann Ripert and Yidin Niu in Southampton, NY, 2009. Movements: Passacaglia; Romp; Musical work noted, Eastman School of Music's "Alumni Notes."
Toccata (2011)	pf	WorldCat	Solo piano. Inspired by the changes in the use and definition of the musical term Toccata through history.

== Ensembles ==
=== Brass ensembles ===
Title(date)	Scoring	Cite	Notes
Three Movements For Brass Sextet (1975)	2hn 2tpt tbn tu		(00:04:00) Published by Seesaw Music Corp. Brass ensemble, brass sextet, larger chamber ensembles - more than 4 players.
Sonata for brass quintet (1985)	brass_quintet	USCO WorldCat	Published by Seesaw Music Corp. Movements: Structure; Elegy; Swing

=== Small Ensembles ===
Title(date)	Scoring	Cite	Notes
Images (1981)	cl vn pf	USCO WorldCat	(00:12:00) Chamber ensemble, Clarinet–Violin–Piano Trio. Commissioned by the Verdehr Trio and recorded by Leonarda Productions. Movements: Allegro; Andante (Variations on a Colonial hymn); Allegro vivace; The numerical designation of this musical work is Op.22.
Serenade (1982)	cl[B♭] string-quartet/mixed-ensemble	USCO WorldCat	(00:10:00) The numerical designation of this musical work is Op.24.
Aria (1985)	cl str[quartet]	WorldCat	(00:04:00) Originally for clarinet and string quartet written in 1982. Arranged for any string, woodwind, bassoon, cello, and piano in 1985. The numerical designation of this musical work is Op.31.
Clowning Around (2011)	4flute (flute[+]) (alto-flute) (perc)	WorldCat	(00:05:00) Flute ensemble with percussion. Written for NYC's "Make Music New York" initiative. Premiered June 2011 in Central Park, NYC. Performance at the NFA's 2011 Convention by a large group of attendees, choreographed by Zara Lawler.

=== Large Ensemble ===
Title(date)	Scoring	Cite	Notes
Summer Night (Nuit d'Ete) (1985)	fl hn[F] vn vn va vc cbn (pn[solo with])	USCO LCCN WorldCat	(00:08:00) Originally composed for flute and horn with string orchestra, rearranged in 1986 for solos with piano. Premiered by the New York Concerto Orchestra outdoors in Lincoln Center, September 1985. Copyright by Theodore Presser, 1986. The numerical designation of this musical work is Op.34.
Psalm 23 (1981)	(chamber-orch) / (fl ob cl bn 2hn str)	USCO WorldCat	(00:04:00) Inspired by his mother's debilitating illness, the composer added music to Biblical text. First performance, Mother's Day 1981 at All-Saints church in New York, directed by the Reverend Dennis Michno. Premiered Cathedral of St. John the Divine, NYC, October 24, 1981 with 400 chorus and orchestra. Composer's mother died the following day. The numerical designation for orchestra is Op.21a.
Clarinet Concerto (1987)	cl pf orch	USCO LCCN WorldCat	(00:22:00) Solo Clarinet with piano and orchestra. Originally for orchestra; piano solo added. Premiered by Eddie Daniels with the Santa Fe Symphony. Elegy, is dedicated to the composer's mother-in-law and close friend, Lee Goodwin. Movements: Allehro; Elegy; Allegro vivace; The numerical designation of this musical work is Op.38.
Stitch-Te Naku (1994)	vc orch	USCO WorldCat	(00:22:00) Cello with chamber orchestra. Written for Sharon Robinson. Premiered by Sharon Robinson and the Rohnert Park Chamber Orchestra, N. Washburn conducting in 1996, at the Orchestra's inaugural concert in Rohnert Park, CA. Inspired by SW Indian creation story, "Spider Grandmother".
Bounce1 (1997)	orch	USCO	(00:12:00) Overture for orchestra. Inspired by a ball bouncing and then adding layer upon layer of different balls.

== Orchestra ==
Title(date)	Scoring	Cite	Notes
The Medieval Suite: flute & piano (1979)	fl orch	USCO LCCN WorldCat	(00:19:00) Premiered Reno Symphony: C. Smith fl, R. Daniels, conducting, November 1989. Inspired by characters and events from Barbara Tuchman's A Distant Mirror: The Calamitous Fourteenth Century. NFA Newly Published Music Award, 1987. Movements: Depouillement: Virelai; The Black Knight; The Drunken Friar; On the Betrothal of Princess Isabelle of France, Aged Six Years; Demon's Dance; The numerical designation of the original musical work is Op.18.
Eleni: A Greek Tragedy (1986)	solo alto [3333 4331 timp perc gtr str]	USCO: WorldCat	(00:15:00) Premiered by the Harrisburg Symphony with Larry Newland conducting, 1987. Tone poem based on Nicholas Gage's book Eleni, the story of his mother's heroism during the Greek Civil War. Dedicated to Eleni Gatzoyannis, who was tortured and executed by Communist partisans for attempting to smuggle her children out of Greece in 1948. The numerical designation of this musical work is Op.36.
Two Sketches (1989)	[2223(2) 2210 pn hp vc timp perc str]	USCO WorldCat	(00:12:00) Commissioned by and Premiered by Bay Area Women's Philharmonic, Faletta conducting 4/20/90 in San Francisco. Movements: Winter sands; Turnabout; The numerical designation of this musical work is Op.42.
Night Skies (1993)	[4333 6440 hp timp perc str]	USCO WorldCat	(00:24:00) Premiered 1994 by the Harrisburg Symphony, L. Newland, Music Director; composer conducting. The first section inspired by Henri-Edmond Cross's painting, "Landscape with Stars". As work continued the second section was engaged by the nightscapes of Albert Pinkham Ryder, which feature mysterious and haunting moons and hazy, sensual forms. For orchestra: 2nd flute also doubles on shakuhachi.
Turner Impressions (2006)	[3333 4331 3perc hp pn hpd]	WorldCat	(00:22:00) Inspired by J. M. W. Turner's painting. Movements: The Grand Canal; A Steamboat in a Snowstorm; The Music Room; A First Rater
Four winds (2013)	fl orch (pf)	WorldCat	(00:10:00) Originally for flute and orchestra; Copyright from the score: 2013. Arranged for Flute and piano 2015. Premiered 2015 by Mark Sparks at the NFA Convention in Washington, D.C. Movements: East; South; West; North

== Voice ==
=== Voice, solo with accompaniment ===
Title(date)	Scoring	Cite	Notes
Four Carols (1970)	sop fl/ww		(00:09:00) Small chamber ensemble. Basis of composer's first published work. Theme, Christmas Written for any female voice, any high voice, any voice, any woodwind, flute, soprano.
Seven Haiku (1973)	sop fl	USCO WorldCat	(00:08:00) Mixed duet. Musical inspiration from seven haiku poems from various Japanese authors. Movements: That white peony, (Gyodai); Swat softly, (Shiki); Now that eyes of hawks, (Basho); The snake departed, (Kyoshi); For a lovely bowl, (Basho); But if I held it, (Buson; I have known lovers, (Anonymous); The numerical designation of this musical work is Op.3.
Wings (1973)	mezzo ww[quartet]	WorldCat	(00:09:00) Premiered December 15, 1974 at the New York Historical Society. Inspired by Robert Frost's poem "Acceptance." Movements: Acceptance; Auspex; The numerical designation of this musical work is Op.4.
To Many A Well (1977)	mezzo pf	USCO	(00:05:39) Inspired by an anonymous medieval poem. The numerical designation of this musical work is Op.12.
Selima (1979)	sop cl pf	USCO WorldCat	(00:07:00) Written for The Ariel Ensemble. Recorded 1987 by The Ariel Ensemble: Julia Lovett, soprano; Jerome Bunke, clarinet; Michael Fardink, piano. This work is subtitled: "Ode on the death of a favourite cat, Drowned in a tub of goldfishes." Inspired by the setting of a poem by Thomas Gray, spoofing serious philosophical Odes. The numerical designation of this musical work is Op.16.
From the Testament of Francois Villon (1982)	bass/bar bn str[quartet]	USCO WorldCat	(00:24:00) Commissioned by L. Lindell, premiered 1985 by L. Hindell & John Cheekat and String Quartet, at Merkin Hall. Musical settings inspired by selections from "The Testament and other Poems" by François Villon, with poem by Galway Mills Kinnell. The numerical designation of this musical work is Op.26.
The Heart Speaks (1997)	sop pf	USCO WorldCat	(00:18:00) Inspired by the portrayal of delight, despair, love, contempt, courage, and to a chilling look at the folly of war within poetry written by Anna Wickham & Sara Teasdale. Movements: Passing by; Wood song; Gray eyes; Faith; The gift; Lullaby; Soft rains
Central American Songs (2004)	v[med] fl pf perc	USCO WorldCat	(00:12:00) Mixed Quartet. Commissioned by Indiana University of Pennsylvania. Inspired by an unusual book titled Izok Amar - Go, meaning "women going forward with love, not bitterness". Words originally in English, Mayan or Spanish. Central American Women's Poetry for Peace is the title of the same poetry edited by Zoe Anglesey. Movements: The woman of Huipil (based upon Celina Garcia's "The Word".); Remedies (based upon a poem by Virginia Grutter translated by Janet Rodney.); Prayer for a son disappeared (based on a poem by Maria Perez Tzu, transcribed from Mayan and translated by Ambar Past.)
The Word in Flower (2009)	mez fl gtr	WorldCat	Commissioned by the New York State Music Teachers Association and the Music Teachers National Association. Premiered in 2009, by Katherine Ciesinsky, Bonita Boyd, and Nickolas Goluseswas at the Eastman School of Music. Inspired by Mayan poems. Movements: Invocation and prayer of the gods; For a dead child; To enchant the spindle

=== Choral A cappella ===
Title(date)	Scoring	Cite	Notes
Three Carols (1972)	ch[ssa]	USCO WorldCat	(00:09:00) First published work. Christmas themes with titles: Now make we mirthe; Have mercy of me; There is no rose; The numerical designation of this musical work is Op.1a.
The Last Invocation (1984)	2ch[satb]	USCO WorldCat	(00:03:48) Inspiration from a poem by Walt Whitman. The numerical designation of this musical work is Op.30.
Sweet Thievery (1985)	madrigal[satb/ch]	WorldCat	(00:03:30) The numerical designation of this musical work is Op.35.
Blow Thou Winter Wind (1999)	ch[satb]	WorldCat	(00:03:20)
Echo (1998)	ch[satb] a cappella	WorldCat	(00:04:48) Poem by Christina Georgina Rossetti, music composed by composer.
Blessing (Blossoms and Branches) (2002)	ch	WorldCat	(00:07:35) 6th movement of Requiem: service of remembrance. Performed: The New York Virtuoso Singers, Choir with Rosenbaum, Harold, Conductor, Track 14.
For Peace: Prayer in Time of War (2003)	fch a capella	WorldCat	(00:03:43) Performed by the New York Virtuoso Singers, Choir with Harold Rosenbaum, Conductor, Track 3.
Peace Is the Way (2003)	satb[satb/ch]	WorldCat	(00:02:31) Inspired by the 2003 invasion of Iraq and a quote from A. J. Muste. Performed: New York Virtuoso Singers with Harold Rosenbaum, Conductor, Track 5.

=== Choral with accompaniment ===
Title(date)	Scoring	Cite	Notes
Three Carols (1972)	ch[ssa] (fl)	USCO WorldCat	(00:09:00) First published work. Christmas themes with titles: Now make we mirthe; Have mercy of me; There is no rose; The numerical designation of this musical work is Op.1a.
Songs of Joy (1974)	ch[stab] (kbd / br[qrt])	USCO WorldCat	(00:11:00) Arrangements of traditional German Christmas carols with titles: Rejoice; Of a young maid; Run, run, all ye Shepherds; Do you hear?; Come, ye shepherds; The numerical designation of this musical work is Op.5.
Litanae Domini (1976)	2ch[stab] 8fl	USCO	Arrangements of music by Giovanni Pierluigi da Palestrina, with new music & arrangement by composer. Theme, secular.
Four English Songs (1976)	ch[stab] bn ob pn	USCO WorldCat	(00:12:00) Inspired by 4 poems in Public Domain, new music by composer. The numerical designation of this musical work is Op.9.
Psalm 23 (1981)	ch[satb] org (orch)	USCO WorldCat	00:04:00) Inspired by his mother's debilitating illness, the composer added music to Biblical text. First performance, Mother's Day 1981 at All-Saints Church in New York, directed by the Reverend Dennis Michno. Premiered Cathedral of St. John the Divine, NYC, October 24, 1981 with 400 chorus and orchestra. Composer's mother died the following day. The numerical designation of the choral work is Op.21.
Songs of Celebration (1983)	(2satb kbd)/(br[quartet])	USCO	(00:13:00) Based on old German Christmas songs, musical arrangement, new settings and new translations by composer with titles: From Heaven Above; Good Christians All, Rejoice; Lo, How a Rose e'er Blooming; O Nightingale, Awake; As Mary Walked Among The Thorn; Current copyright by Warner Chappell Music. The numerical designation of this musical work is Op.29.
Psalm 100 (1997)	ch[satb] pf/org/kbd	USCO	(00:04:00) Theme: prayer.
Kyrie (1998)	ch pf	USCO LCCN WorldCat	(00:08:00) Commissioned by and premiered by Tucson Flute Club, NFA Convention, 1998. Inspired by the Gregorian chant "Kyrie fons bonitatis" as found in the Liber Usualis.
Requiem for the innocent (2002)	nar[m f] satb[solo] ch[satb] (br perc org/pn) / (acc)	USCO WorldCat	(00:38:00) In Memoriam of 9/11 and friends lost in the tragedy. Premiered in 2002 at St. Peter's Lutheran Church, New York City. Based on poetry by Walt Whitman, and the Requiem Mass; both Latin and English. Movements: Requiem aeternam; Kyrie; Dies irae (Day of fury); Thou, Thou; Sanctus; Blossoms and branches (7:35)
Incantations (2006)	fch[ssa] fl perc	v[ssa] fl perc	Commissioned by the New York Treble Singers. Inspired by Mayan women's poetry.
