= Josephs Legende =

1914 ballet by Richard Strauss

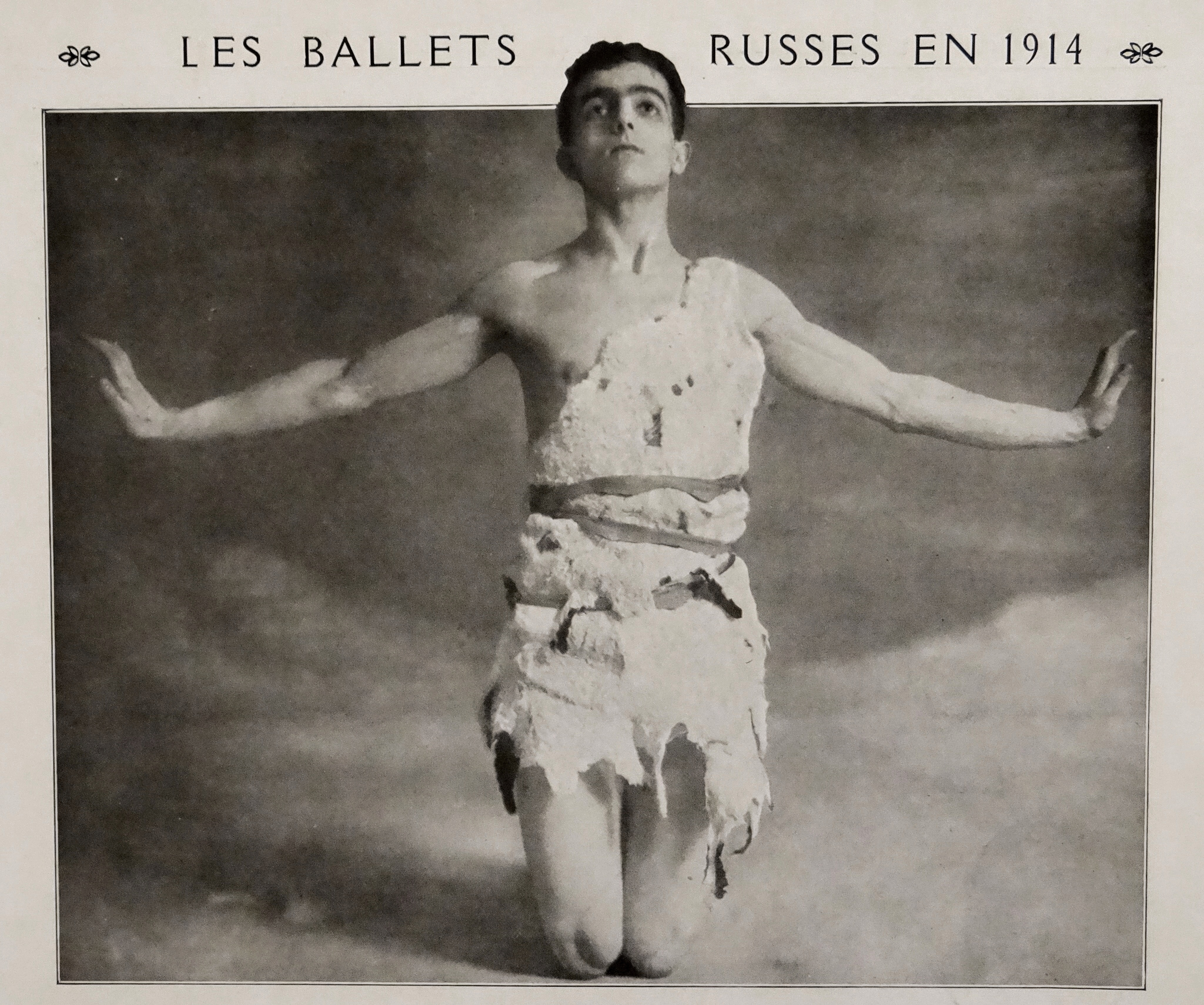
Léonide Massine as Joseph in La Légende de Joseph (1914)

Josephs Legende (The Legend of Joseph), Op. 63, is a ballet in one act for the Ballets Russes based on the story of Joseph and Potiphar's wife, with a libretto by Hugo von Hofmannsthal and Harry von Kessler and music by Richard Strauss. Composed from 1912 to 1914, it premiered at the Paris Opera on 14 May 1914.

== Composition ==
Hugo von Hofmannsthal first proposed Josephs Legende to Strauss as a Zwischenarbeit (interim work) between Ariadne auf Naxos and Die Frau ohne Schatten. Composition began in June 1912, but in a letter of 11 September Strauss confided that the work was not progressing as quickly as he expected: "The chaste Joseph himself isn't at all up my street, and if a thing bores me I find it difficult to set it to music. This God-seeker Joseph – he's going to be a hell of an effort!"

Strauss drew on earlier sketches for his abandoned ballet Die Insel Kythere and wrote for an outsized orchestra with exotic instrumental colouring including four harps, large and small cymbals, four pairs of castanets, heckelphone, and a contrabass clarinet.

== Instrumentation ==
Josephs Legende is scored for the following instruments:

Woodwinds
1 Piccolo
4 Flutes (3rd doubling 2nd piccolo)
2 Oboes
1 Cor anglais (doubling 3rd oboe)
1 Heckelphone
1 Clarinet in D
2 Clarinets in A
1 Bass clarinet in A
1 Contrabass clarinet (doubled by either 2nd clarinet or clarinet in D)
3 Bassoons
1 Contrabassoon

Brass
6 Horns
4 Trumpets
4 Trombones
1 Tenor tuba
1 Bass tuba

Percussion
Timpani (2 players)
Glockenspiel
Xylophone
Large and small cymbals
Snare drum
Bass drum
Triangle
Tambourine
4 Castanets
Wind machine

4 Harps
Organ
Celesta
Piano

Strings
1st, 2nd, and 3rd violins (10 players each)
1st and 2nd violas (8 players each)
1st and 2nd cellos (6 players each)
Double basses

== Performance history ==
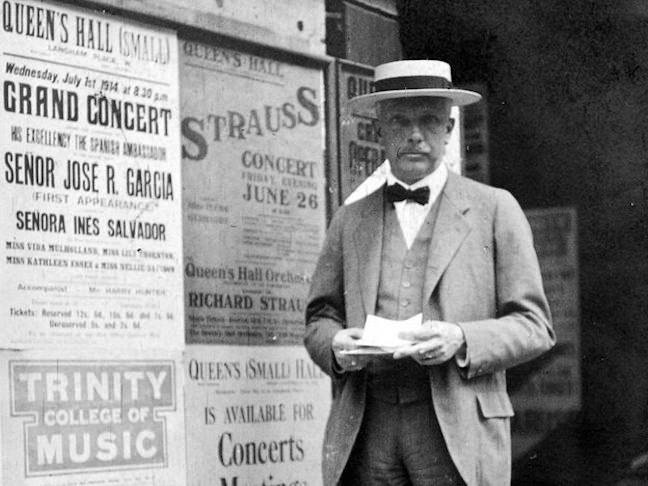
Strauss in London, June 1914 to conduct the UK premiere of Josephs Legende

With Diaghilev as impresario, Nijinsky as choreographer and creator of the title role – replaced after his marriage and fall from grace by Fokine and Massine – costumes by Léon Bakst and Alexandre Benois, scenic design after Veronese by Josep Maria Sert, and Strauss conducting the premiere, the initial run lasted seven performances.

This was shortly followed by a further seven in London in June conducted by Richard Strauss (UK premiere 23 June) and Sir Thomas Beecham, who had loaned the money for the commission to Diaghilev. With the looming war, Strauss never received his fee of 6,000 francs.

Later choreographers included George Balanchine, Antony Tudor, and John Neumeier, but none of their versions was considered more successful.

== Symphonic fragment ==
In 1947, Strauss prepared a symphonic fragment from Josephs Legende for reduced orchestra. This was premiered in February 1949 in San Antonio under Max Reiter.

== Recordings ==
=== Audio ===
- Staatskapelle Dresden, conducted by Giuseppe Sinopoli (Deutsche Grammophon)
- Budapest Festival Orchestra, conducted by Iván Fischer (Channel Classics Records)
- The first complete recording of the work was performed in 1987 by the Tokyo Metropolitan Symphony Orchestra, conducted by Hiroshi Wakasugi

=== Video ===
- 1977: Judith Jamison (Potiphar's wife), Kevin Haigen (Joseph), Karl Musil (The angel), Franz Wilhelm (Potiphar), and members of the Vienna State Ballet. Orchestra: Vienna Philharmonic, conducted by Heinrich Hollreiser; choreography and direction by John Neumeier; scenery and costumes by Ernst Fuchs; after a production by the Vienna State Opera. Studio production, filmed by Unitel, 1977.

== See also ==
- List of ballets by title
