= Youth Orchestras of San Antonio =

Organization for students in Texas, U.S.

Youth Orchestras of San Antonio (YOSA) is an organization encompassing multiple musical ensembles that provides rehearsal and performance opportunities for students of (primarily) orchestral instruments in the San Antonio, Texas, area. As of the 2024–2025 season, the YOSA ensembles are the philharmonic, the symphony, the wind ensemble, the flute choir, the Mariachi, the Concertino Strings, the Repertory Strings, the Intermezzo Strings, the Sinfonietta Strings, the Capriccio Strings, and the Prelude Strings. YOSA also offers a Summer Symphony Camp and a Rising Star Fellows program for people of color.

== Early history ==
G. Lewis Doll (1901–1985) established the first string program in the San Antonio Independent School District (SAISD) in the 1940s. At that time, no other public school district in San Antonio offered string instruction. As the SAISD string program grew, Doll started the San Antonio Youth Symphony around 1950. A second orchestra for junior high school students was formed in the 1960s, and both orchestras operated under the auspices of the SAISD until 1979.

== 1974–1983 ==
The San Antonio Youth Symphony began receiving grant money from the City of San Antonio, Texas in 1974 and became known as the Greater San Antonio Youth Symphony Orchestras (GSAYSO). At this time, only four of the 19 area school districts offered string music programs. The GSAYSO opened string learning centers in some of the districts that were without a strings program. When this strings learning center program ceased in 1979, only the Northside Independent School District was able to sponsor its own string program.

The Youth Philharmonic Orchestras of San Antonio was formed in 1977 and operated independently of GSAYSO until they merged in March 1979. The name Youth Orchestras of San Antonio (YOSA) was formally adopted in the summer of 1979.

Maintaining four orchestras for the first few years of its existence proved to be impractical for the young YOSA organization. In 1981, the orchestras were reduced to two even though the demand by talented student musicians continued to grow. During the 1982–83 season, the City of San Antonio Parks and Recreation Department provided YOSA with office space, a secretary, and other assistance, which stabilized YOSA's financial picture and attracted more private and business support.

== 1984–1994 ==
The decade from 1984 to 1994 saw steady growth in both student membership and services provided by YOSA. A strong coaching staff was added to the program, enhancing the quality of the students' musicianship. A landmark event in YOSA history came in 1985 with the addition of a tour of Eastern Europe with performances in Poland Romania, Hungary, and Austria. YOSA experienced firsthand the deprivations of Communist control, and the enthusiastic support of full concert halls. They were emotionally overcome at a visit to Auschwitz, and tasted acid rain in the air of Krakow. The tour was sponsored by the City of San Antonio Parks and Recreation Department and KMOL and KENS TV, local television stations, and made under the auspices of the Friendship Ambassadors Foundation, a non-profit organization specializing in cultural and educational exchanges. Publicity about the tour resulted in another sharp increase in YOSA membership.

As a result of the fundraising efforts for the international tour, the parents’ support group was formalized to the Parents’ Auxiliary Organization and continues to be the main vehicle for raising money for students' individual tour accounts. To date, most of the money raised by the Parents' Auxiliary Organization continues to be used to support touring fees on behalf of the student musicians.

== Performances ==
Local YOSA performances have included community events, including the City of San Antonio's Christmas tree-lighting ceremonies and the opening concert of the Founders’ Day celebration. Regional exchanges and tours to cities such as Fort Worth, Houston and Corpus Christi have been included in season schedules. The Summer String Camp has been conducted by YOSA annually since 1986 and now includes classes in theory, composition, and conducting. In the 2005–2006 season, the YOSA Philharmonic orchestra launched their Gold Series with international guest artists accompanying their top orchestra.

== Great Tour of China 2010 ==
In 2010, YOSA, under the leadership of conductor Troy Peters, made its first tour of China. It was YOSA's eighth international tour. The orchestra toured five cities in fourteen days, with four performances. The first performance was in Beijing, at the National Centre for the Performing Arts. The second performance was an outdoor concert at the Shanghai World Expo. The third concert took place in Hangzhou, at the Zhejiang Provincial Concert Hall. The fourth and final concert was in Hong Kong, a side-by-side concert with the Hong Kong Youth Symphony Orchestra (HKYSO) at the Kwai Tsing Theater. In addition to these four cities, the YOSA group also made stops in Wuzhen and Shenzhen. The tour orchestra consisted of young musicians ages 12–19 from both the YOSA Symphony Orchestra and the YOSA Philharmonic Orchestra.

== Conductors ==
Music Director Troy Peters joined Youth Orchestras of San Antonio in August 2009. Prior to joining YOSA, he served for 14 years as the music director of the Vermont Youth Orchestra Association, as well as the Middlebury College Orchestra and Montpelier Chamber Orchestra. Peters conducted over 20 performances with the San Antonio Symphony, twice stepping in last-minute. In 2012–13 he made his guest conducting debut with the Oregon Symphony. Peters has gained attention for his orchestral collaborations with rock musicians such as Jon Anderson of Yes and Trey Anastasio of Phish, along with orchestral soloists Midori, Edgar Meyer, Horacio Gutiérrez, Daniel Bernard Roumain (DBR) and Soovin Kim. Past conducting positions include the Philadelphia Youth Orchestra, the Pacific Chamber Soloists, and Perpetuum Mobile.

== See also ==
- Children's Chorus of San Antonio
