= Akiko Fujimoto =

Conductor

- Born: Japan
- Alma mater: Stanford University; Boston University; Eastman School of Music
- Occupation: Conductor
- Employer: Minnesota Orchestra; San Antonio Symphony; Vermont Symphony Orchestra
- Website: akikofujimoto.com

Akiko Fujimoto is a Japanese-born American conductor. Since 2019 she has been the music director of the Mid-Texas Symphony, and in 2026 she was appointed as the music director of the Symphony of Northwest Arkansas. She has held positions as associate conductor of the Minnesota Orchestra and the San Antonio Symphony, conducting associate for the Virginia Symphony Orchestra, and cover conductor for the Los Angeles Philharmonic, and has appeared as a guest conductor for the National Symphony Orchestra, Houston Symphony, North Carolina Symphony, Florida Orchestra, Fort Wayne Philharmonic Orchestra, Corpus Christi Symphony, Lexington Philharmonic Orchestra, and Vermont Symphony Orchestra. Fujimoto became the first woman to hold a full-time conducting position on the artistic staff of the San Antonio Symphony when she was hired as its assistant conductor in 2011. In 2017, she became the second woman to conduct the Minnesota Orchestra. In 2019, Fujimoto became the first woman conductor for the Mid-Texas Symphony.

== Personal life ==
Fujimoto was born in Japan. When she was 14, she moved with her parents to the United States because her father was relocated by the company he worked for.

== Education ==
Fujimoto earned a Bachelors of Arts degree in Psychology and Music at Stanford University. She later went on to earn her Master's degrees in choral and orchestral conducting from Eastman School of Music in 1999 and Boston University in 2001.

== Career ==
Fujimoto worked under JoAnn Falletta when Falletta was the music director for the Virginia Symphony Orchestra.

From 2012 to 2017, Fujimoto was the associate conductor of the San Antonio Symphony and its first woman conductor.

She worked for the Minnesota Orchestra as an associate conductor from 2017 to 2020.

On September 15, 2019, Fujimoto had her first public concert with the Mid-Texas Symphony at Texas Lutheran University in Seguin as a guest conductor. In October 2019, she was hired to be the Mid-Texas Symphony as their next music director, a position she still holds as of 2024.

In 2021, Fujimoto was one of seven candidates who applied to lead Vermont Symphony Orchestra. She was a guest conductor on October 30, 2021, where she closed the Vermont Symphony Orchestra program with Ludwig van Beethoven’s Symphony No. 1 in C Major, Op. 21 and Suad Bushnaq’s “Sampson’s Walk on Air.”
