= Symphony of Northwest Arkansas =

The Symphony of Northwest Arkansas (SoNA) is a professional orchestra in the Northwest region of Arkansas, founded with support from corporate, foundation and private donors. SoNA performs as a resident company of Walton Arts Center in Fayetteville, Arkansas and frequently collaborates with area ensembles and institutions, including the University of Arkansas, John Brown University and Crystal Bridges Museum of Art.

== History ==
SoNA is an independent 501(c) 3 organization, and is the new name for the former North Arkansas Symphony (NASO), which was founded in 1954. After a 3-year hiatus and restructure of the organization in 2008, SoNA returned to the stage in the spring of 2011. SoNA has an active board of directors and advisors composed of community leaders from throughout Northwest Arkansas.

In the fall of 2013, SoNA launched an arts integration educational program, ImagiMusic, which has enabled SoNA to reach over 3,000 students from ten regional Tier 1 schools.

== Conductors ==
- 1981–1997 – Carlton Woods
- 1999–2008 – Jeannine Wagar
- 2010–2026 – Paul Haas
- 2026–present – Akiko Fujimoto
