= Christopher Seaman =

British conductor (born 1942)

- Born: 7 March 1942 (age 84); Faversham, Kent, England
- Occupation: British conductor

Christopher Seaman (born 7 March 1942, Faversham) is a British conductor.

== Early life ==
Seaman was born to Albert Edward Seaman and Ethel Margery Seaman.

He was educated at Canterbury Cathedral Choir School and The King's School, Canterbury, and later studied at King's College, Cambridge.

== Career ==
From 1964 to 1968, he was principal timpanist with the London Philharmonic Orchestra, before his appointment from 1968 to 1970 as assistant conductor with the BBC Scottish Symphony Orchestra (BBC SSO). He later served as the BBC SSO's principal conductor, from 1971 to 1977. Seaman has also held the post of principal guest conductor and artistic advisor to the conducting course at the Guildhall School of Music. He also had a long association with the National Youth Orchestra of Great Britain.

In the US, Seaman was resident conductor of the Baltimore Symphony Orchestra from 1987 to 1998. From 1993 to 2004, he was music director of the Naples Philharmonic Orchestra, in Naples, Florida. In 1998, he became music director of the Rochester Philharmonic Orchestra, continuing through 2011 and becoming that orchestra's longest-tenured conductor. In October 2009, the orchestra announced the conclusion of Seaman's tenure as director with the 2010–2011 season, and his lifetime appointment as the RPO's conductor laureate.

Seaman has conducted recordings with the Rochester Philharmonic for the harmonia mundi label. He is also currently the artistic advisor to the San Antonio Symphony Orchestra, through the 2009–2010 season.

His book Inside Conducting was published in 2013.

Cultural offices
Preceded by James Loughran	Chief Conductor, BBC Scottish Symphony Orchestra; 1971-1977	Succeeded by Karl Anton Rickenbacher
Preceded by Rudolf Schwarz	Principal Conductor, Northern Sinfonia; 1973-1979	Succeeded by Tamás Vásáry and Iván Fischer
