= Robert L. Annis =

American muisician

Robert L. Annis is an American musician and Dean and Director of Westminster College of the Arts of Rider University, which includes the Westminster Choir College. Annis, a Grammy-nominated clarinetist, has performed with various orchestras throughout the country. He serves as a member of Collage New Music, a chamber music organization based in Boston, and is a member of the Board of Trustees for the Princeton Symphony Orchestra in Princeton, New Jersey. He has served as Dean of Enrollment at the New England Conservatory. A conservatory building was named in his honor at the USC Thornton School of Music.

Annis was previously a member of the San Antonio Symphony and on the faculty of Brown University.

Annis is an alumnus of New England Conservatory, Harvard University and the USC Thornton School of Music.
