= Franz Benteler =

American violinist (1925–2010)

- Born: Franz M. Benteler; 1 June 1925; Hamburg
- Died: 12 March 2010 (aged 84); Arlington Heights, Illinois, U.S.
- Children: 6
- Musical career
- Origin: Chicago, Illinois, U.S.
- Instrument: Violin
- Years active: 1946-2007

Franz M. Benteler (1 June 1925 – 12 March 2010) was an American virtuoso violinist from Chicago, Illinois. A favorite of Chicago Mayor Richard J. Daley, Benteler was known as the "Ambassador of Music for Chicago".

== Early life ==
Benteler was born in Hamburg, Germany, to Franz Xavier Benteler (1881–1967) and Maria (née Maria Franziska Keimeyer; 1888–1976). He immigrated to the United States with his parents on September 5, 1930, at the age of 5. His family first lived in Newark, New Jersey. Benteler began taking violin lessons at age 8 and arrived in Chicago at age 9. He attended Lane Technical High School's music program. In 1943, Benteler began studying at the Chicago Conservatory of Music on a two-year scholarship. He went on to earn a Bachelor of Arts and Master of Arts from the conservatory.

== Career ==
For a year, beginning around 1946, Benteler had been first violinist for the San Antonio Symphony Orchestra. Then, in 1948, Benteler toured with Wayne King's Orchestra, covering 56 cities over 58 days. Benteler settled in Chicago as a professional musician. He played at the Blackstone Hotel and the Old Heidelberg Restaurant in Chicago's Loop.

With his group The Royal Strings Orchestra, Benteler was known for playing at the Consort Room, the 16th floor restaurant at the Continental Plaza Hotel (now known as the Westin Michigan Avenue) for 20 years, from 1963 to 1983.

Benteler and his band performed for international dignitaries and five US Presidents. They also performed summertime concerts at Oak Brook Central Park.

He retired in 2007.

== Instruments ==
Benteler owned a 1701 Stradivarius violin. In 1997, he performed on a 1770 Maggini violin. Also, in the 1950s, he performed on a 1775 Balestrieri violin, valued in 1957 at $15,000 USD.

== Personal life ==
Benteler was married three times. He had been married to his co-performer, Jan Norris (stage name) (née Jeannette Olmstead; born 1931), a vocalist, from about 1958 to the mid-1970s. Benteler's second wife was “Dee” Benteler. His last wife was Maria (née Arreola), whom he married in 1984.

Benteler had six children: Eric Mark (1986–2003), Franz Brett (born 1976), Adele Maria (born 1980), Stefan Joseph (born 1981), Christopher Franz, and Kristine Diane (born 1984).

Franz Benteler died of a stroke in Arlington Heights, Illinois.
