= Maximilian Dimoff =

Maximilian Dimoff (born June 23, 1968) has been the principal bassist of the Cleveland Orchestra since 1997.

== Career ==
He has appeared with the orchestra at their summer venue, the Blossom Festival, performing Koussevitsky's Concerto for Double Bass. He attended Northwestern University, where he studied with Jeff Bradetich. Before joining the Cleveland Orchestra, he served as the principal bassist of the San Antonio Symphony, and section bass in the Grant Park Symphony and the Seattle Symphony. Dimoff has presented master classes at the Manhattan School of Music and several universities. He was formerly the head of the double bass department at the Cleveland Institute of Music, with fellow Cleveland Orchestra bassist Scott Dixon. He is currently the head of the double bass program at the University of Michigan.
