= Mark Sparks =

American classical flutist and teacher (born 1960)

- Born: July 3, 1960 (age 66); Baltimore, MD
- Origin: St. Louis, Missouri
- Genre: Classical
- Occupations: Soloist, teacher
- Instrument: Flute
- Years active: 1978–present
- Formerly of: St. Louis Symphony Orchestra
- Website: official website

Mark Sparks is a former principal flutist of the St. Louis Symphony Orchestra, and a teacher and soloist.

== Early life ==
Sparks was born in 1960 and raised in Cleveland and St. Louis, where he studied with former St. Louis Symphony principal flutist Jacob Berg and former St. Louis Symphony piccoloist Jan Gippo. He graduated from the Oberlin Conservatory of Music where he studied with Robert Hugh Willoughby.

== Career ==
Sparks began his career in the Canton Symphony Orchestra in Ohio and with the Caracas Symphony in Venezuela. Before his appointment to the St. Louis Symphony, Sparks served as associate principal flute with the Baltimore Symphony Orchestra under David Zinman, and principal flute of the San Antonio Symphony and the Memphis Symphony Orchestra.

Sparks is also a teacher. He currently teaches at DePaul School of Music, was previously a full-time faculty member at the Peabody Institute, and maintains a private studio in St. Louis. He is an artist-faculty member at the Aspen Music Festival and School. He also teaches at Missouri's Innsbrook Institute, Flauti al Castello in Tuscany, Italy and will join the faculty of the Pacific Music Festival in Sapporo, Japan.

Sparks has recorded two solo albums collaborating with pianist Clinton Adams, appearing on the Summit and AAM labels, and one flute and piano album collaborating with pianist Peter Henderson.
