= San Antonio Symphony =

American symphony orchestra based in Texas

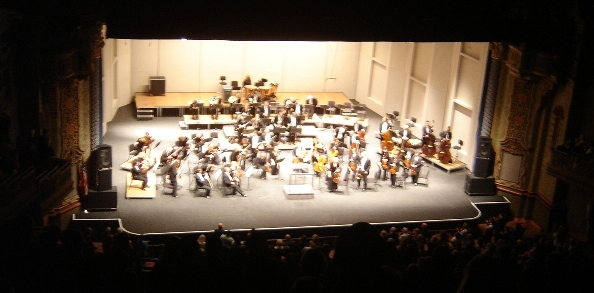
The San Antonio Symphony, Sep 2007

The San Antonio Symphony was a full-time professional symphony orchestra based in San Antonio, Texas. Its season ran from late September to early June. Sebastian Lang-Lessing, its music director from 2010 to 2020, was the last to serve in that capacity. The orchestra was a resident organization of the Tobin Center for the Performing Arts in San Antonio. In August 2022, the orchestra's musicians reformed as the San Antonio Philharmonic, a name first used in 1914, and announced a ten-concert classical-music series for the 2022–23 season to be given at First Baptist Church of San Antonio, 100 yards from Tobin Center.

== Artistic and organizational facts ==
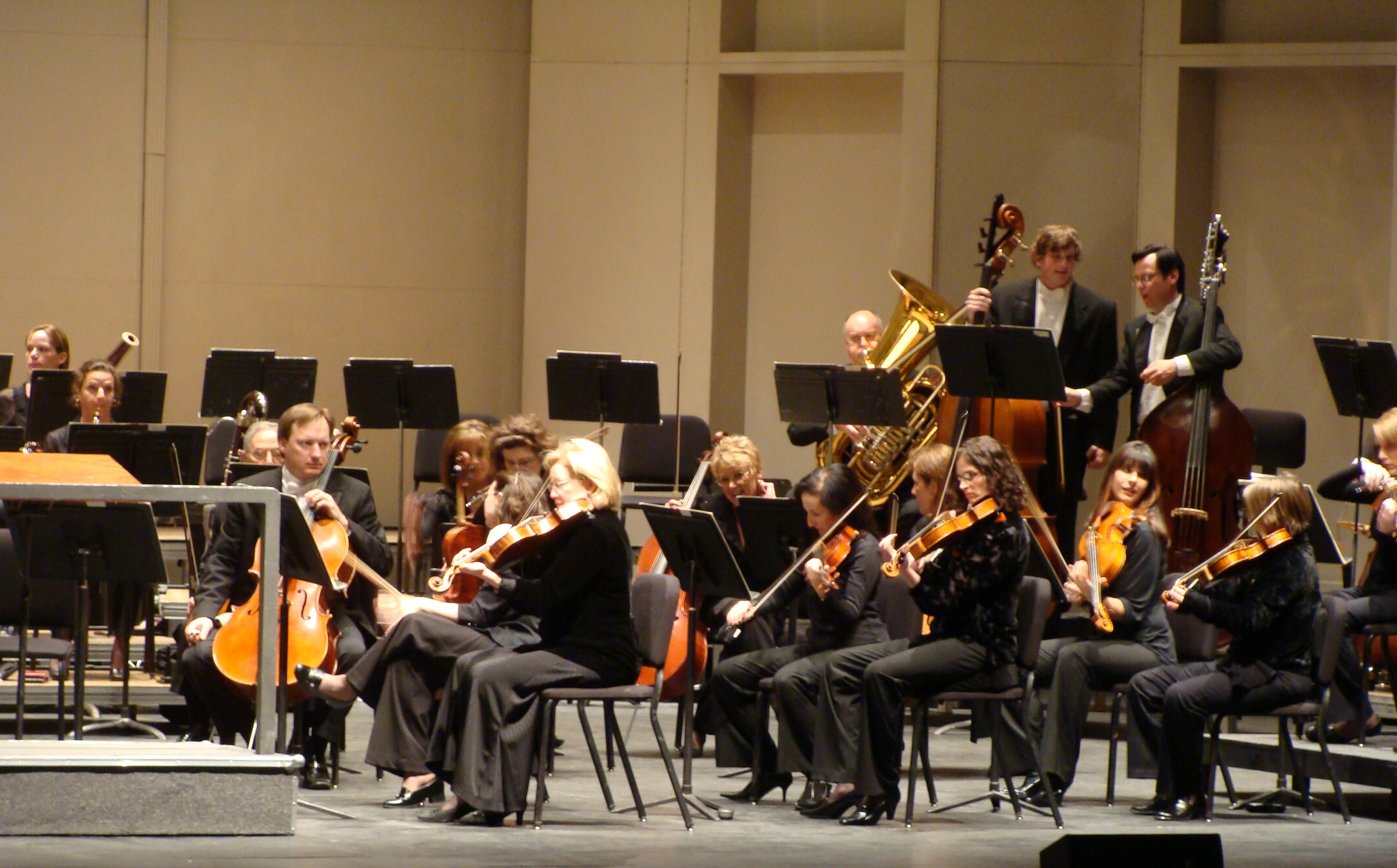
Some members of the San Antonio Symphony warming up before their grand performance with Sarah Chang at The Majestic, March 2009.

The San Antonio Symphony presented a large and diverse selection of music on its concert schedule. The 2018–19 season included 14 different classical subscription programs (each performed twice), six Pops programs (also performed twice each), four different programs in a Young People's Concerts series (each performed between four and eight times), a Family Concert, a concert featuring the musical soundtrack with the screening of a major motion picture, and community outreach programs. Many orchestral concerts featured performances by guest artists. The group also presented soloists in recital, open rehearsals, and an annual string-instrument master class by a visiting guest artist.

The 2018–19 artistic staff of the San Antonio Symphony consisted of Music Director Sebastian Lang-Lessing, Assistant Conductor Noam Aviel, Mastersingers Conductor John Silantien, and 72 full-time musicians. The musicians collectively belonged to the International Conference of Symphony and Opera Musicians (ICSOM), and virtually all were (and remain) members of the American Federation of Musicians (AFM). The San Antonio Mastersingers is a chorus that performed frequently with the symphony. Its members participate on a volunteer basis. Each year the San Antonio Symphony was joined by the Philharmonic Orchestra of YOSA, Youth Orchestras of San Antonio, for a side-by-side concert. The organization was a member of the League of American Orchestras.

== History ==
=== Early efforts (1887 to 1920s) ===
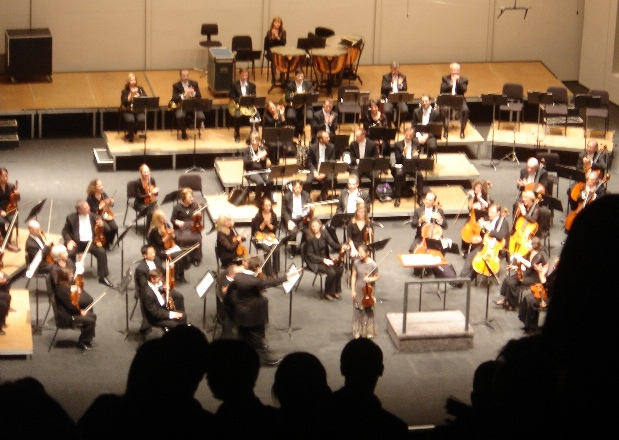
Standing ovation for San Antonio Symphony and violin virtuoso Midori Goto, Sep 28, 2007.

Orchestral music in San Antonio traces its beginnings to a series of four concerts by a 49-piece orchestra directed by German immigrant Carl Beck at the state Sängerfest in 1887. A performance of Felix Mendelssohn's Symphony No. 4 in these concerts was the first of a complete symphony in the state of Texas. Beck again conducted a symphony orchestra when the Sängerfest returned to San Antonio in 1896. He was engaged as the director of the Beethoven Männerchor in San Antonio, then succeeded in that role by Carl Hahn in about 1904. Hahn worked with Anna Goodman Hertzberg, a leading local musician and arts patron, to create the San Antonio Symphony Orchestra, which gave its first concert on May 18, 1905. The orchestra performed sporadically for the next several years but was revived in 1914 as the "San Antonio Philharmonic" by conductor Arthur Claassen. By 1916, the ensemble was again called the San Antonio Symphony Orchestra. From 1917 to 1922 the San Antonio Symphony was under the musical direction of Julien Paul Blitz. The organization appears to have foundered around the time Blitz's tenure ended.

=== 1939 to 2022 ===
The most recent San Antonio Symphony, an organization independent of the aforementioned predecessors, was created in 1939 by Max Reiter, a German-Italian immigrant, who became its first music director. The group's early ambition is evidenced by the fact that the legendary violinist Jascha Heifetz was a guest artist during the first season. By 1943, the orchestra employed 75 professional musicians, and in the 1944–45 season its budget topped $100,000, making it one of only 19 "major" orchestras in the country at that time, and the only one in Texas. Unlike many orchestras, the San Antonio Symphony was able to continue operations through World War II—largely because the city's strong military presence helped bolster the local economy. Before his death in 1950, Reiter started an Opera Festival, created an Opera Chorus, and brought nationwide attention to the orchestra, with world premieres by several important composers, guest appearances by world-class artists, and overall high musical quality.

Reiter was succeeded by Victor Alessandro, a native Texan. The orchestra continued to grow in scope, including the addition of Young People's Concerts. In 1969, it took up residence in the Theater for the Performing Arts (which was later renamed the Lila Cockrell Theatre). In 1967, the orchestra made its first major-label recordings, for Mercury Records. Alessandro died in 1976. Financial difficulties forced the cancellation of much of the 1987–88 season. During this time, the musicians formed and presented a concert series with their own organization, Orchestra San Antonio. The 1990s were highlighted by recognition and acclaim for the San Antonio Symphony's creative and culturally diverse programming, culminating in awards from the National Endowment for the Arts (NEA), the American Symphony Orchestra League (ASOL), the American Society of Composers, Authors, and Publishers (ASCAP), and the Knight Foundation.

The 2003–04 season was cancelled due to bankruptcy. In the early part of the 2006–07 season, the executive board chose not to renew music director Larry Rachleff's contract beyond the following season. The musicians and many San Antonio Symphony supporters opposed this decision. In January 2008, Christopher Seaman was appointed artistic adviser, a "position . . . similar to that of an interim music director," for one season. Sebastian Lang-Lessing became the orchestra's eighth music director in 71 years with a concert on October 2, 2010. Akiko Fujimoto became the first woman to hold a full-time conducting position on the orchestra's artistic staff when she was hired as its assistant conductor in 2011.

From 1939 to 2017 the Symphony Society of San Antonio managed the orchestra's operations. In 2017 these were turned over to Symphonic Music for San Antonio, also a nonprofit organization. But SMSA pulled out of this agreement in December 2017, leaving the organization in a poor position, and in January 2018, the bulk of the symphony's remaining 2017–18 season was canceled. With the help of a fundraising effort spearheaded by Kathleen Weir Vale, the remainder of the 2017–18 season was salvaged, and the Symphony Society returned as the governing body.

=== Demise ===
In September 2021, the musicians of the San Antonio Symphony called a strike in response to a contract proposal by the board and management that would have called for them to accept significant reductions in status, salary, and complement. Despite negotiations and arbitration throughout what would have been the 2021–22 season, no agreement was reached, and ultimately the entire season was canceled. During the spring of 2022, the musicians presented a series of orchestral concerts as the Musicians of the San Antonio Symphony (MOSAS). Lang-Lessing had held the title of music director emeritus since 2020 but was stripped of that title when he announced that he would conduct a set of MOSAS performances. On June 16, 2022, the board of the San Antonio Symphony voted unanimously to initiate Chapter 7 bankruptcy proceedings to effect the organization's dissolution.

=== San Antonio Philharmonic ===
In August 2022, the San Antonio Philharmonic was created; its musicians comprise much of the former San Antonio Symphony membership. For its first two and a half seasons, the orchestra presented its classical subscription concerts in the First Baptist Church of San Antonio. In February 2024, Jeffrey Kahane was named the San Antonio Philharmonic's first music director. In October 2024, the philharmonic signed an agreement to make the Scottish Rite Cathedral, a structure built in 1924, its permanent home. In 2025, the philharmonic began performing its subscription concerts in the Scottish Rite Hall.

As of 2026, Roberto C. Treviño is the executive director, and the board is chaired by Lauren Eberhart.

In February 2026, Kahane resigned from his position as music director, and days later Roberto Treviño announced the cancellation of the remainder of the 2025–2026 San Antonio Philharmonic season. In June 2026, Felipe Tristán was named interim artistic director.

== Performance venues ==
The following is a chronological listing of the primary performance venues of the San Antonio Symphony and the San Antonio Philharmonic:

San Antonio Symphony (1939–2022):

- San Antonio Municipal Auditorium
- Theatre for the Performing Arts, later named Lila Cockrell Theatre, at Henry B. González Convention Center
- Majestic Theatre
- Tobin Center for the Performing Arts

San Antonio Philharmonic (2022–present):

- First Baptist Church of San Antonio
- Scottish Rite Hall

== Music directors ==
	Organizations known as the San Antonio Symphony or Philharmonic, pre-1930
1905–c. 1914	Carl Hahn (23 October 1874 Cincinnati – 13 May 1929 Cincinnati)
1914–1917	Arthur Claassen (19 February 1859 Stargard, Germany – 16 March 1920 San Francisco)
1917–1922	Julien Paul Blitz (21 May 1885 Ghent – 17 July 1951 Dallas)
	San Antonio Symphony, 1939–2022
1939–1950	Max Reiter (20 October 1905 Trieste, Italy – 13 December 1950 San Antonio)
1950–1976	Victor Alessandro (27 November 1915 Waco – 27 November 1976 San Antonio)
1978–1980	François H. Huybrechts (born 15 June 1946 Antwerp, Belgium)
1980–1985	Lawrence Leighton Smith (8 April 1936 Portland, Oregon – 25 October 2013 Colorado Springs, Colorado)
1992–2000	Christopher Wilkins (born 28 May 1957 Boston). For the 1991–1992 season, Wilkins's title was "Music Director Designate."
2004–2008	Larry Rachleff (25 February 1955 New London, Connecticut – 8 August 2022 Houston)
2010–2020	Sebastian Lang-Lessing (born 1966 Gelsenkirchen, Germany). Lang-Lessing held the designation "Music Director Emeritus" from 2020 to 2022.
	San Antonio Philharmonic, 2022–present
2024–2026	Jeffrey Kahane (born 12 September 1956 Los Angeles)
Notes:	Sixten Ehrling (3 April 1918 Malmö, Sweden – 13 February 2005 New York City) and Christopher Seaman (born 7 March 1942 Faversham, England) served as Artistic Advisors for the San Antonio Symphony, and Zdeněk Mácal (8 January 1936 Brno, Czechoslovakia – 25 October 2023 Prague) served as artistic director and principal conductor of the San Antonio Symphony.

== Musicians ==
Members of the San Antonio Symphony with Wikipedia articles include:

- 1971–1973: Robert L. Annis, clarinet
- 1946–1947: Franz Benteler, violin
- 1990–1993: Maximilian Dimoff, assistant principal and principal bass
- 1948–1951: Julius Hegyi, concertmaster
- 1952–1958: Eugene Lacritz, clarinet; Pops conductor, 1951–1958
- 1952–1955: Eric Rosenblith, concertmaster
- 1994–2007: Stephanie Sant'Ambrogio, concertmaster
- 1939–1941: Bill Sinkin, violin
- 1985–1987: Mark Sparks, principal flute
- 1959–1964: Daniel Stolper, principal oboe
- 1963–1964: Donald Weilerstein, concertmaster
- 1951–1963: Clifton Williams, horn and guest conductor

== See also ==
- The Majestic Theatre, San Antonio

== Sources ==
- "Immigrant conductor founded symphony during war years." Allen, Paula. San Antonio Express-News, 27 March 2005.
- International Who's Who in Music and Musical Gazetteer, ed. César Saerchinger. New York: Current Literature Publishing Company, 1918.
- San Antonio Symphony, Season 07–08 (program book)
- "San Antonio Symphony Orchestra." Albrecht, Theodore. The Handbook of Texas Online
- Wolz, Larry. "Roots of Classical Music in Texas: The German Contribution." Chapter 5 of The Roots of Texas Music, ed. Lawrence Clayton and Joe W. Specht. College Station: Texas A&M University Press, 2003. ISBN 1-58544-221-6.
