= San Antonio Mastersingers =

The San Antonio Mastersingers, founded in 1944, is an independent chorus that performs major choral works with orchestras. It was previously the official chorus of the San Antonio Philharmonic and the San Antonio Symphony. In addition to performing with the Philharmonic, the chorus performs several other concerts annually in San Antonio, Texas, and surrounding communities. The 2007–2008 season culminated with a performance at Carnegie Hall in New York.

== See also ==
- San Antonio Symphony
