= Victor Alessandro =

American orchestral conductor

Victor Nicholas Alessandro (November 27, 1915 – November 27, 1976) was an American orchestral conductor.

== Conducting career ==
In 1938, at age 22, he became conductor of the Oklahoma City Symphony Orchestra, an organization that he led from a WPA project to an accomplished ensemble with broad civic support. When Max Reiter, conductor of the San Antonio Symphony Orchestra, died in December 1950, Alessandro took over much of the remaining season; he signed a contract as permanent conductor in April 1951. The next year he also assumed leadership of the San Antonio Symphony Society's Grand Opera Festival.

Alessandro was at his best in works by Tchaikovsky, Wagner and Richard Strauss. He was a sympathetic interpreter of Johannes Brahms and the odd-numbered symphonies of Ludwig van Beethoven. He introduced works by Anton Bruckner, Gustav Mahler, and Alban Berg to San Antonio audiences before they became fashionable elsewhere. He conducted memorable performances of Elektra, Salome, Nabucco, Boris Godunov, Susannah, Die Meistersinger, and the standard operas of Giuseppe Verdi and Giacomo Puccini. In building the San Antonio orchestra he was an exacting, often irascible taskmaster of high musical standards. But he was capable of less formidable moments as well; in February 1962, for instance, he dedicated a performance of Ein Heldenleben to the memory of Bruno Walter.

== Growing up ==
He was born in Waco, Texas, on November 27, 1915. His father, Victor Alessandro (1883–1971) was a prominent conductor and music teacher in public schools. The Alessandros moved to Houston in 1919. Victor was introduced to music at an early age and studied French horn with his father. He made his conducting debut at age four, when he led a children's band in a performance of Victor Herbert's March of the Toys.

== Higher education ==
In 1932, he entered the Eastman School of Music in Rochester, New York, where he studied composition with Howard Hanson. He then studied at the Salzburg Mozarteum and the St. Cecilia Academy in Rome, where he studied with Ildebrando Pizzetti.

== Honors ==
Alessandro received three honorary doctorates:

- Eastman School of Music, University of Rochester, 1948 (as of 1964, Alessandro was the only graduate of Eastman an honorary Ph.D. degree in music conferred on him by the University of Rochester)
- Southwestern University, Georgetown, Texas, May 1975
- Doctor of Humanities, Southern Methodist University, May 1956

In 1956, he received the Alice M. Ditson Award for service to American music.

== Selected discography ==
Recordings of his work include Claude Debussy's Martyrdom of St. Sebastian (1950), light accompaniments (ca. 1953), Antonio Vivaldi and Rodrigo guitar concertos and works by Richard Strauss and John Corigliano (1967–68).

== Family ==
In 1956, he married flutist Ruth Drisko (1926–1996). They had two children, Victor Tabbut Alessandro (born 1958) and Ruth Ann Alessandro (1959–1992). With his health declining, Alessandro retired in 1976. He died in San Antonio, Texas, on November 27, 1976, his 61st birthday.

== See also ==
- The Conductor (sculpture)

== Bibliography ==
=== References ===
- Theodore Albrecht, "101 Years of Symphonic Music in San Antonio," Southwestern Musician/Texas Music Educator, March, November 1975
- Baker's Biographical Dictionary of Musicians, 1978
- Hope Stoddard, Symphony Conductors of the U.S.A. (New York: Crowell, 1957). Theodore Albrecht Edited by Victor T. Alessandro 2012
- The New Encyclopedia of the Opera. By David Ewen. New York: Hill & Wang, 1971
- Who's Who in Opera. An international biographical directory of singers, conductors, directors, designers, and administrators. Also including profiles of 101 opera companies. Edited by Maria F. Rich. New York: Arno Press, 1976
- Baker's Biographical Dictionary of Musicians. Sixth edition. Revised by Nicolas Slonimsky. London: Collier Macmillan Publishers
- Baker's Biographical Dictionary of Musicians. Seventh edition. Revised by Nicolas Slonimsky. New York: Macmillan Publishing Co., Schirmer Books, 1984
- Biography Index. A cumulative index to biographical material in books and magazines. Volume 4: September, 1955-August, 1958. New York: H.W. Wilson Co., 1960
- Biography Index. A cumulative index to biographical material in books and magazines. Volume 8: September, 1967-August, 1970. New York: H.W. Wilson Co., 1971
- Biography Index. A cumulative index to biographical material in books and magazines. Volume 11: September, 1976-August, 1979. New York: H.W. Wilson Co., 1980
- The New Grove Dictionary of American Music. Four volumes. Edited by H. Wiley Hitchcock & Stanley Sadie. London: Macmillan Press, 1986
- The New York Times Biographical Service. A compilation of current biographical information of general interest. Volume 7, Numbers 1- 12. New York: Arno Press, 1976
- The Blue Book. Leaders of the English-speaking world. 1976 edition. New York: St. Martin's Press, 1976
- Baker's Biographical Dictionary of Musicians.
1. 8th ed. – "Alessandro, Victor (Nicholas)". Revised by Nicolas Slonimsky. Macmillan Publishers. 1992. p. 24 – via Internet Archive. LCCN 91-24591; ISBN 978-0-0287-2415-7, 0-0287-2415-1; OCLC 727953249 (all editions).
2. 9th ed. – Vol. 1: "Aalt–Cone" (6 Vols.). Revised by Nicolas Slonimsky, ed. emeritus; Laura Kuhn, advisory ed. Schirmer Books. 2001. LCCN 00-46375; ISBN 978-0-0286-6091-2, 0-0286-6091-9 (Vol. 1).
  1. ""Alessandro, Victor (Nicholas)". p. 46 – via Internet Archive.
- Baker's Biographical Dictionary of Twentieth-Century Classical Musicians. By Nicolas Slonimsky. New York: Schirmer Books, 1997
- International Who's Who in Music and Musicians' Directory. Ninth edition. Edited by Adrian Gaster. Cambridge, England: International Who's Who in Music, 1980. Earlier editions published as Who's Who in Music and Musicians' International Directory
- Who Was Who in America. Volume 7, 1977-1981. Chicago: Marquis Who's Who, 1981
- The International Who's Who. 38th edition. London: Europa Publications, 1974
- The International Who's Who. 39th edition. London: Europa Publications, 1975
- The International Who's Who. 40th edition. London: Europa Publications, 1976
- International Who's Who in Music and Musicians' Directory. Eighth edition. Cambridge, England: International Who's Who in Music, 1977. Earlier editions published as Who's Who in Music and Musicians' International Directory.
- Who's Who in America. 38th edition, 1974-1975. Wilmette, IL: Marquis Who's Who, 1974
- Who's Who in America. 39th edition, 1976-1977. Wilmette, IL: Marquis Who's Who, 1976
- Who's Who in Music and Musicians' International Directory. Sixth edition. New York: Hafner Publishing Co., 1972
- Who's Who in the South and Southwest. 13th edition, 1973-1974. Wilmette, IL: Marquis Who's Who, 1973
- Who's Who in the South and Southwest. 14th edition, 1975-1976. Wilmette, IL: Marquis Who's Who, 1975
- Who's Who in the South and Southwest. 15th edition, 1976-1977. Wilmette, IL: Marquis Who's Who, 1976
- The International Who's Who. 41st edition. London: Europa Publications, 1977 (the obituary section is located at the front of the volume)

Cultural offices
| Preceded by Max Reiter | Music Directors, San Antonio Symphony; 1950–1976 | Succeeded by François Huybrechts |
