= Arthur Claassen =

Orchestral conductor

Arthur Claassen, Sr.
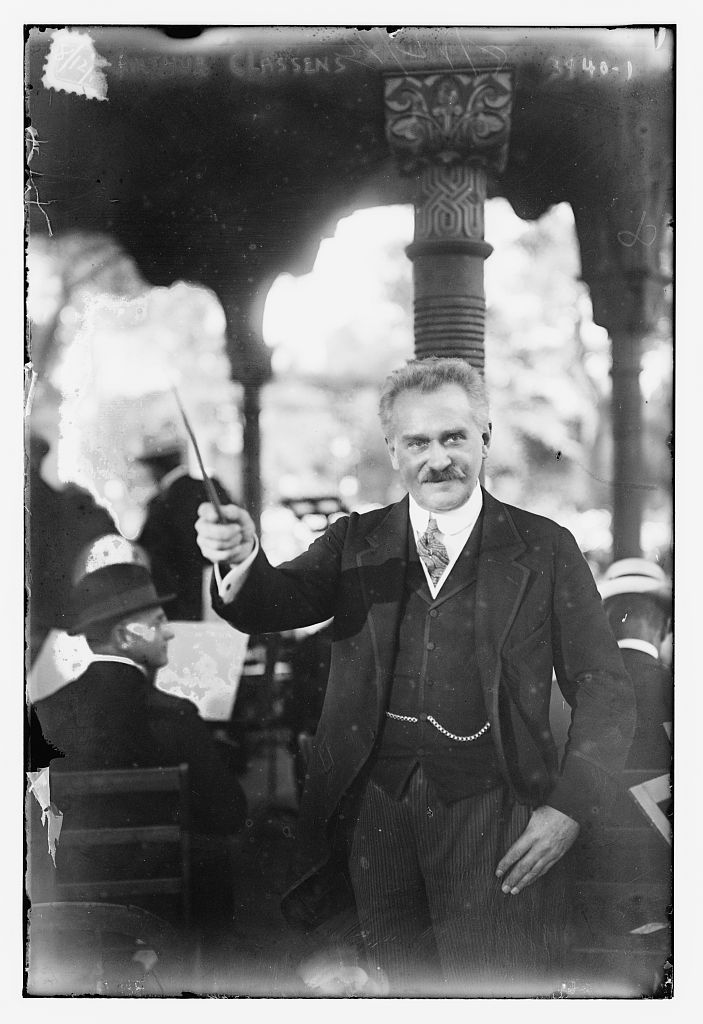
- Claassen in 1916
- Born: February 19, 1859; Stargard, Germany
- Died: March 16, 1920 (aged 61); San Francisco, California
- Other names: Arthur Claaßen

Arthur Claassen, Sr. (February 19, 1859 – March 16, 1920) was an orchestral conductor.

== Biography ==
He was born in Stargard, Germany, on February 19, 1859. He attended the music school in Weimar, Germany. From 1880 to 1884 he worked as an opera conductor in Göttingen and Magdeburg. In 1884 he migrated to the United States and became the conductor for the New York Eichenkranz and then the conductor for the Brooklyn Arion in 1890. Claassen moved to San Francisco, California, in 1919.

He died on March 16, 1920, in San Francisco. He was buried in Mission Burial Park South in San Antonio, Texas.
