= Landscape with Sky =

Painting by Henri-Edmond Cross

Landscape with Stars
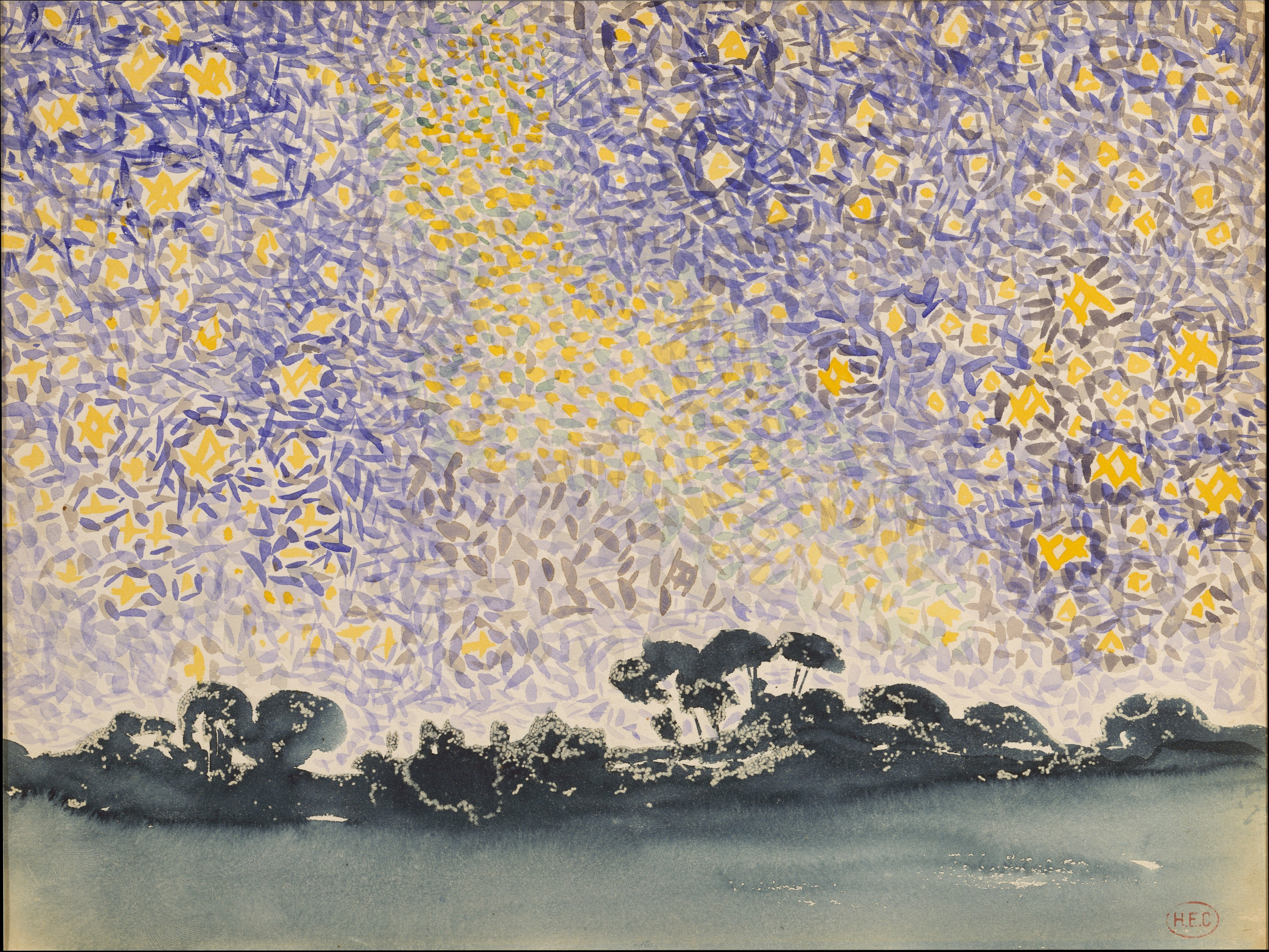
- Artist: Henri-Edmond Cross
- Year: c. 1905
- Medium: Watercolor on paper
- Dimensions: 24.4 cm × 32.1 cm (9.6 in × 12.6 in)
- Location: Metropolitan Museum of Art; New York City
- Accession: 1975.1.592

Landscape with Stars is an early 20th century painting by Henri-Edmond Cross. Done in watercolor on white wove paper, the work is a part of the collection of the Metropolitan Museum of Art in New York City.

Reminiscent of Italian painting, the impressionistic work depicts a star-studded sky above a pen and ink landscape. One art critic described the work as combining decorative and scientific aspects.
