= Max Reiter =

American conductor

Max Reiter (20 October 1905 Trieste, Austro-Hungarian Empire – 13 December 1950 San Antonio) was an Italian-born American conductor who founded the San Antonio Symphony Orchestra in 1939 and developed it to the rank of a major symphony orchestra. He led the San Antonio Symphony until his death in 1950.

== Conducting appointments ==
- 1925 — Assistant Conductor, Berlin State Opera
- Munich Philharmonic
- Milan Conservatory Orchestra
- 1938 — Augusteo Orchestra in Rome

== Growing up ==
Reiter was born in Trieste, Italy, on October 20, 1905 to Isaac Reiter, a Jewish German-born businessman father, and Cella, a native Italian mother. When he was ten years old, his family moved to Munich, where he continued his middle-school education and went on to attend a university. He studied conducting with Bruno Walter and, at the insistence of his father, earned a doctorate in law.

== Immigration to America ==
Reiter fled his home in Italy in 1939, during the rise in fascism and antisemitism. He arrived in New York in January 1939, where the Steinway family advised him to go to Texas, a place they felt held employment potential. The Steinways felt that Texas was least affected by the Great Depression, and, given strong piano sales, showed great enthusiasm for music. The Steinway family informed Reiter Texans had purchased more Steinway pianos per capita than in any other state.

== Move to Texas ==
With a list of eighteen Texas cities to visit, Reiter's first stop was in Waco, at Baylor University, where he persuaded the university president to let him work one week with the orchestra, which he did with success. A couple of people from San Antonio who heard the concert persuaded him to try conducting in San Antonio. On June 12, 1939, Reiter gave a demonstration concert at the Sunken Garden Amphitheater. From then on, Reiter flourished as the founding musical director of the San Antonio Symphony Orchestra, while directing the quality symphony orchestra that he founded in Waco.

== Death ==
In December 1950, Reiter was told to give his heart a rest. Heeding the advice, he recommended Victor Alessandro as a guest conductor. Alessandro, who was a Texas-born conductor, was at the time the conductor of the Oklahoma City Philharmonic. Reiter's condition was more serious than he thought; within a week he was dead. Pleased with Reiter's endorsement, the San Antonio Symphony Society offered Alessandro a three-year contract in January 1951.
