= Claudi Arimany =

Spanish flute player

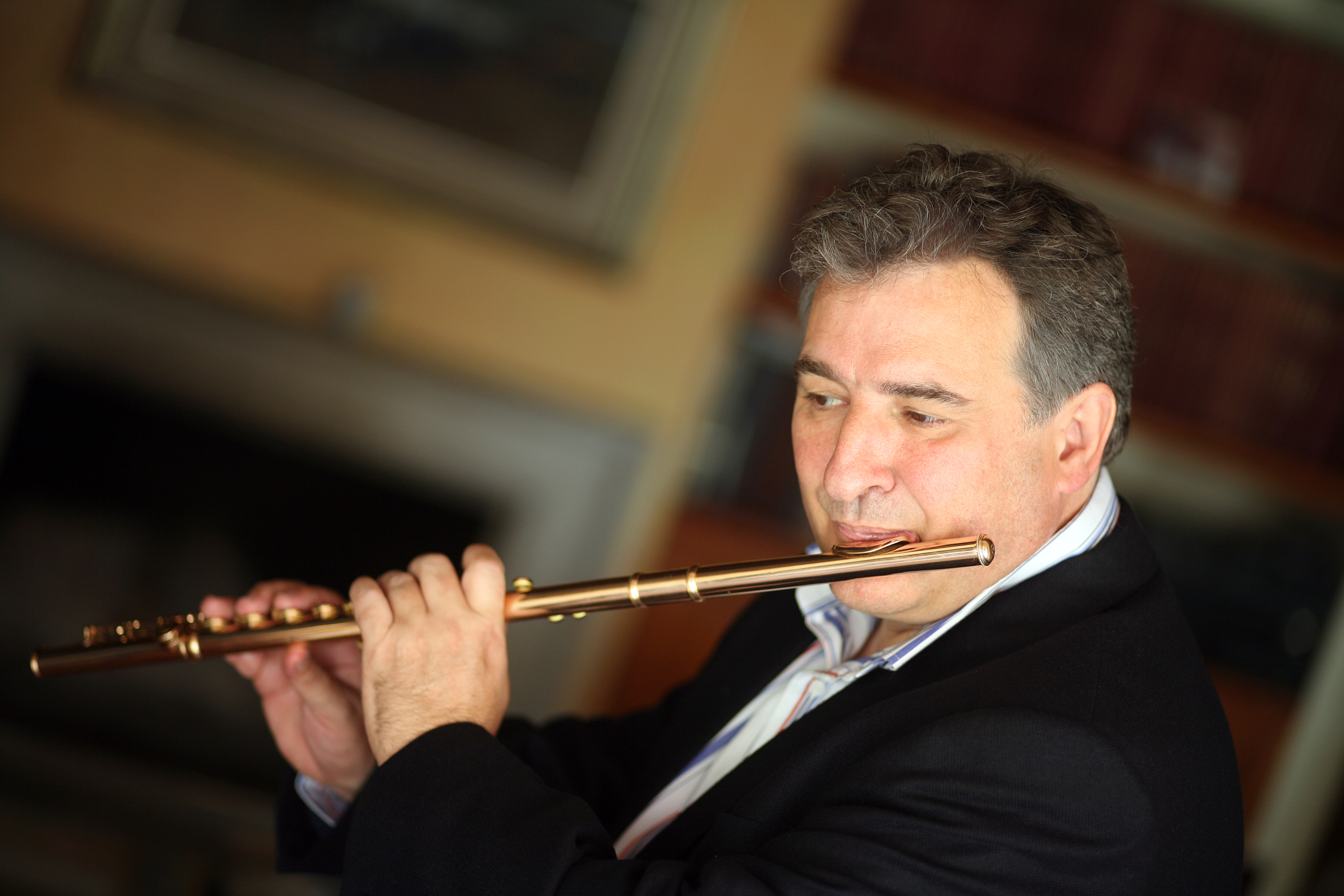

Background information
- Born: December 29, 1955 (age 70); Granollers, Catalonia
- Genres: Classic
- Instrument: flute
- Labels: Delos Saphyr and Sony Classical
- Website: http://www.claudiarimany.com

Claudi Arimany i Barceló (born in Granollers, Catalonia, December 29, 1955) is an international flautist, considered the direct heir, both in interpretative style and in musical concept, of Jean-Pierre Rampal, his mentor and colleague in many concerts. Since the 1980s he has performed with leading international orchestras as a guest soloist, as well as teaching and working to study and revive pieces for flute.

== Biography ==
Claudi Arimany started his business studies at ESADE while learning to play the flute as a hobby. Back then, he was more interested in jazz than in classical music and did not expect to pursue a professional musical career. He took lessons from pianist and composer Josep Maria Ruera in Arimany's home city and from Salvador Gratacós in Barcelona. Gratacós sought to foster a keen interest in the instrument and its repertoire among his students and to create an environment geared towards continuous improvement. Gratacós also invited two masters of that time, Alain Marion and Jean-Pierre Rampal, to participate in the classes when they visited Barcelona to perform. This was how Arimany met master Rampal, but it was not until Arimany saw him act at the Palau de la Música Catalana that he decided to change tack and continue his musical studies in Nice and Paris with masters such as Georgy Sebok, Alain Marion and Raymond Guiot. In 1982 he obtained his diploma in Paris, with a first prize awarded unanimously by the jury.

He lives close to his native region, in Llerona (Les Franqueses del Vallès), whose municipal music school is named after him, and teaches at the "Josep Maria Ruera" Granollers Music School.

== Professional career ==
Arimany has always performed as a soloist artist, but he has shared the stage with leading figures, such as Jean-Pierre Rampal, Maxence Larrieu, Aurèle Nicolet Constantine Orbeliani, Victor Pikaisen, Janos Rolla, Jean-Jacques Kantorow, Nicanor Zabaleta, Marielle Nordmann, Mischa Maisky Victoria de los Angeles, Roland Pidoux and Claudio Scimone.

His work as a performer of international stature has led him to play in major concert halls, such as the Chicago Symphony Center, the Washington Library of Congress, Carnegie Hall in New York Boston Symphony Hall, the Palau de la Musica Catalana in Barcelona, the Amsterdam Concertgebouw, the Beethoven House in Bonn, the National Auditorium of Music in Madrid, the Palais Auersperg in Vienna, the Beijing Concert Hall, the Hollywood Bowl in Los Angeles, the Tchaikovsky Conservatory in Moscow, the Teatro Real in Madrid, the Rudolfinum and Smetana Theatre in Prague, the Gasteig in Munich, the Liederhalle in Stuttgart, the Théâtre des Champs-Élysées, the Salle Pleyel and Salle Gaveau in Paris, Suntory Hall and Bunka Kaykan in Tokyo, and the Konzerthaus in Vienna.

Arimany has also travelled around the world and been invited by leading international groups, such as the Berlin Philharmonic Chamber Orchestra, China National Symphony Orchestra, Bach Orchestra Stuttgart, Moscow Chamber Orchestra, Stuttgarter Kammerorchester, European Union Chamber Orchestra, I Virtuosi Italiani, Czech Philharmonic Mendelssohn Chamber Orchestra Philharmonia Virtuosi New York, New American Chamber Orchestra, Orchestra Internazionale d'Italia, Virtuosi di Praga Chamber Orchestra, Franz Liszt Orchestra Budapest, Arthur Rubinstein Chamber Orchestra Polonia, Israel Sinfonietta, Ensemble Orchestral of Paris, Zagreb Soloists, English Chamber Orchestra Amadeus Chamber Orchestra and Berliner Kammerorchester.

=== Relationship with Jean-Pierre Rampal ===
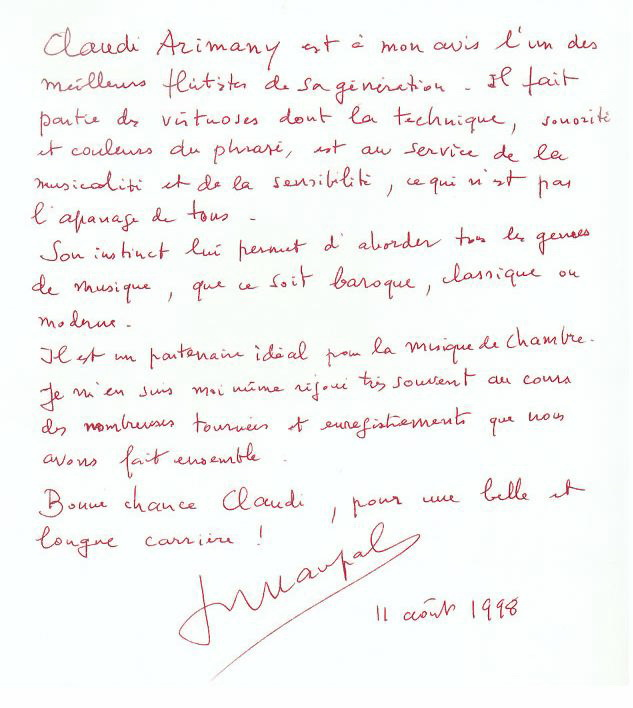
Rampal's quote on Arimany

In addition to his career as a flautist, Jean-Pierre Rampal embarked on a paedagogical quest to recover and spread the flute repertoire, becoming the teacher of an entire generation. Arimany, who had studied with him, began to work with him in the late 1980s. The perfect understanding between them led Rampal to state: "He is the perfect continuation of the French school of flute and my style of play to such extent that even if I listen carefully to the record we created together I cannot tell whether it is he or I who is playing."

The last album they recorded together was dedicated to Mozart and Hoffmeister and released in 1999. Shortly before, Rampal had written his opinion on the art of his pupil and tour companion, which can be considered his artistic will.

Claudi Arimany is, in my opinion, one of the greatest flautists of his generation. He is one of those virtuosi who put technique, sonority and the colours of phrasing at the service of musicality and sensitivity, something not within the grasp of many.

— Jean-Pierre Rampal, 1998

As well as his artistic legacy, Arimany kept much of Rampal's music library and his flutes. The one with the emotional value, which he uses in concerts, is the iconic WS Haynes gold flute.

He has been a member of the jury at the International JP Rampal Flute Competition, held in Paris.

=== Musical research ===
Beyond his extensive work as an interpreter, Arimany has devoted much of his activity to study, recover and spread the work of great forgotten composers. The popularity of the great masters often casts talented disciples and contemporary artists into obscurity. In the words of Arimany, "I am still very interested in the music of the great composers who worked 'around' those who are now better known".

When, in 1986, he submitted a project to edit Bach's pieces for flute to a German label, it was received without interest, since many recordings of this author existed already. Arimany's response to this rejection was to team up with soloists Alexander Schmoller (cello) and Michael Gruber (harpsichord) to review and select virtually unknown pieces practically by German disciples of the Thuringian master. The challenging recovery project culminated in the 1986 release of the album Virtuose Flötenmusik der Bach-Schüler by the German Motette record label (Wiesbaden).

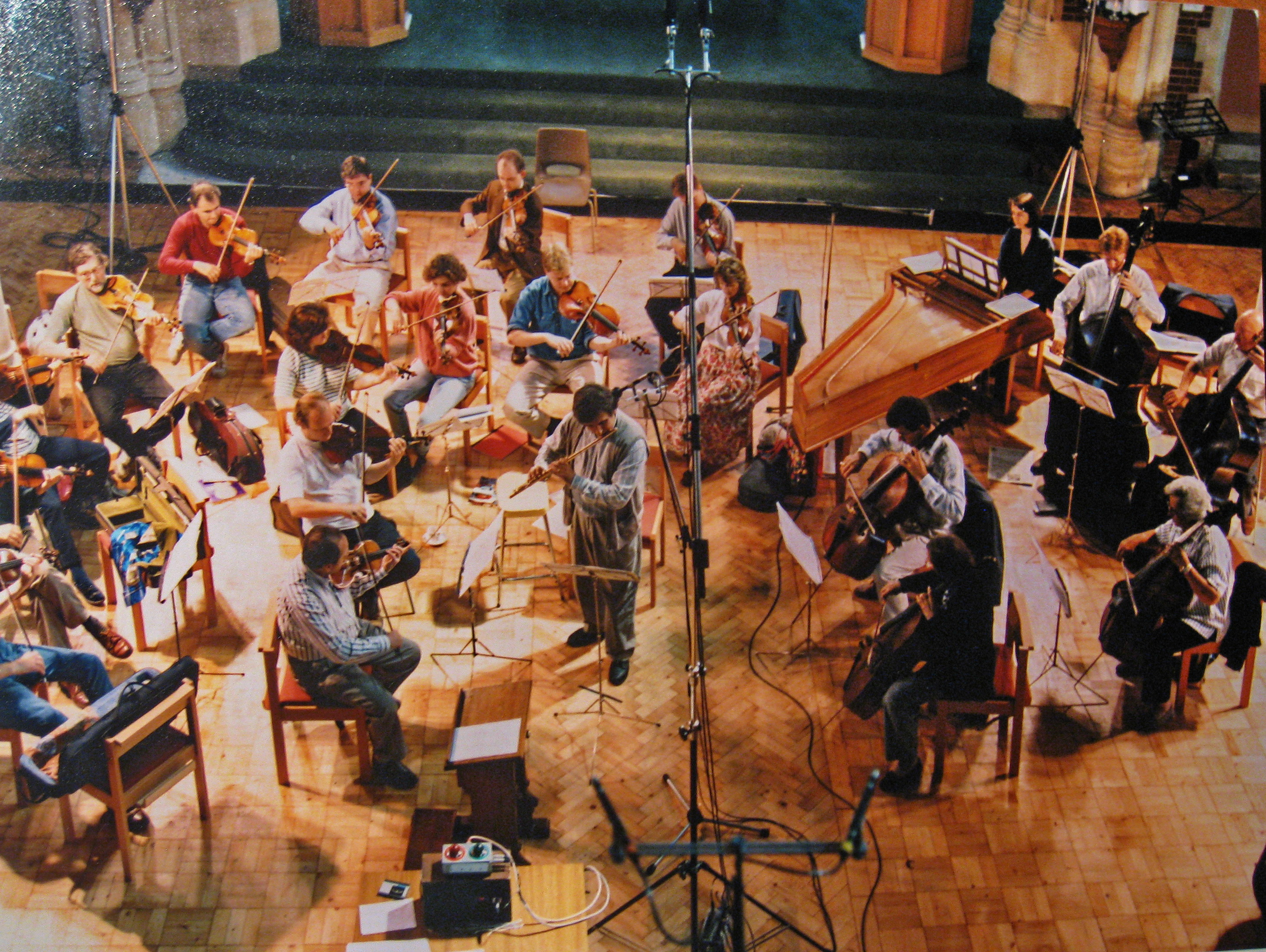
Recording Pla concerts with the English Chamber Orchestra

His special interest in finding Catalan composers who had written for the flute led him to highlight the work of Joan Baptista Pla (Balaguer, 1720–1762), a contemporary of Mozart who travelled throughout Europe, few works of whom have survived. In early 1990, the musicologist Joseph Dolcet found original sheet music by Pla in Germany, which Arimany incorporated into his repertoire together with other material by Pla and his brother Manuel Pla. He later recorded two CDs, one with Jean-Pierre Rampal and the Franz Liszt Chamber Orchestra with works by Joan Plan, and another with three concerts with the English Chamber Orchestra.

The trail of little-known authors took him to the work of François Devienne, a composer and performer who had been popular in his time, earning the moniker "the French Mozart", and had founded the Conservatoire de Paris. However, he had been forgotten until the late 1970s, when his works were reprised. In the mid-1990s, Arimany found the 18th-century edition of all Devienne's concerts. The continuous recovery of works by this author allowed for concerts to be performed in many venues, including the Théâtre des Champs Elysées in Paris, together with the Paris Orchestral Ensemble in November 1994. Arimany has recorded four CDs with the fourteen concertos for flute and orchestra by Devienne, a type of music which Arimany considers "natural, clear, elegant and melancholic, and requires great technical skill".

At the end of 2020 he published a compilation of all the work for flute by the brothers Albert Franz Doppler and Karl Doppler, the result of his research for conservatories and libraries in Europe started in 2007. The result is 12 CDs with 97 pieces, 64 of which are first recordings. Arimany had performed Doppler music at his concerts with Rampal in the 1990s, and once the research began he released two CDs with pieces for two flutes in 2010 and 2012.

== Discography ==
Year	Album	Author	Interpreters	Record
2010	The Brothers Doppler of flute music Music for 2 Flutes & Piano. Vol. 1	Albert Franz Doppler & Karl Doppler	Claude Arimany Shigenori Kudo and Alan Branch	Saphir Productions - B0064TM7VG
2012	Franz & Karl Doppler; Music for 2 Flutes & Piano. Vol. 2 & 3	Albert Franz Doppler & Karl Doppler	Claudi Arimany, John Steele Ritter, Alan Branch, Marta Gulyás and Michel Wagemans	Saphir Productions - LVC1178
2010	Mozart Flute Concerts	Mozart	Claudi Arimany and Moscow Chamber Orchestra	Ensayo Digital - CD9935
1999 (2006)	W. Amadeus Mozart : FÜR Flote Und Neue quartet Streichtrio; Hoffmeister Trio Cello Und fleet FÜR 2	Mozart and Franz Anton Hoffmeister	Jean-Pierre Rampal Claude Pasquier Trio and Arimany	Querstand Records
2011	Complete Flute Concertos Vol. IV	François Devienne	Claude Arimany Symphonic Orchestra and Kishinev	Aurophon - CD
2006	W. Amadeus Mozart : Trios for 2 Flutes and Piano	Mozart	Shigenori Kudo Claudi Arimany and John Steele Ritter	Epson
2006	Une Vie Pour La Musique	François Devienne	Claude Arimany, Alain Marion et al.	Analekta - B000E0VO0Q
2005	Empúries environments; Meditation CD	Josep Maria Ruera	Jordi Maso and Claudi Arimany	Columna Musica - B00008S81J
2005	Elegy	Carlota Garriga	Carlota Garriga and Claudi Arimany	Columna Musica - B0013IOG4O
1997	Romantic Music for 2 Flutes & Piano	Albert Franz Doppler, Friedrich Kuhlau, Mozart, Theobald Böhm, Paul Creston, Friedrich Kuhlau	Jean-Pierre Rampal Claudi Arimany and John Steele Ritter	Delos - DDD3212
2003	Magic Flutes	Mozart, François Devienne, Georg Philipp Telemann and Michel Blavet	Jean-Pierre Rampal and Claudi Arimany	Delos DE3226 -
2003	Flute Concert : Mozart and His Friends	Mozart, Pavel Vranicky and Franz Anton Hoffmeister	Claudi Arimany and Franz Liszt Chamber Orchestra	Novalis
2003	J. J. Quantz: Konzerte FÜR Eine Und Zwei Flöten	Johann Joachim Quantz	Claudi Arimany, Joseph F. Palou and Hungarian Virtuosi Chamber Orchestra	Columna Musica
2003	French Flute Favourites	Philippe Gaubert and Hector Berlioz	Arimany, Claudi et al.	Naxos
2002	The Flute In Mozart 'S Time In Paris. Three flute concertos	Mozart, Ignaz Pleyel and Anton Stamitz	Navy and Claudi Arimany Paccagnella harp - Wroclaw Chamber Orchestra "Leopoldinum"	Papa Music - CD1002
2000	Concerti for flute	Joan Baptista Pla	Claudi Arimany - English Chamber Orchestra	Ensayo Digital - CD9925
1999	Baby Needs More Mozart (The Magic Flute K.620)	Mozart	Claudi Arimany, Jean-Pierre Rampal	Delos
1998	Baby Needs Mozart (K.448 Piano Sonata 2)	Mozart	Claudi Arimany, Jean-Pierre Rampal and John Steele Ritter	Delos
1998	Baby Needs Baroque (Sonata for 2 flutes N.4)	Georg Philipp Telemann	Claudi Arimany and Jean-Pierre Rampal	Delos
1997	Conferenza Musicale Mediterranea	Salvador Brotons	Claudi Arimany and Orchestra da Camera Gli Armonici	CIMS/004 Regione Siciliana
1996	Mozart : Flute Concertos	Mozart	Claudi Arimany, Jean-Pierre Rampal and Hungarian Virtuosi Chamber Orchestra	Prodigital Records - CD2419
1996	Six Trios Pour 3 Flutes	François Devienne	Jean-Pierre Rampal, Claudi Arimany and Alain Marion	Traversieres Flute Collection - CD 210/259
1995	Catalan Flute Music of the 18th Century	Joan Baptista Pla	Claudi Arimany, Jean-Pierre Rampal and Franz Liszt Chamber Orchestra	Sony Classical - SK- CD- 58918
1995	Six Trios pour Basson et 2 Flutes	François Devienne	Jean-Pierre Rampal Arimany Claude Gilbert Audin	Traversieres Flute Collection
1994	Le Rossignol Opera	Music of the French Belle Epoque	Claudi Arimany, Marc Grauwels and Orchestre de Chambre de Waterloo	Syrinx Records - CD 93102
1993	European Flute Festival, Frankfurt am Main	François Devienne	Arimany, Claudi et al.	DGFF001
1993	Complete Flute Concertos Vol. III	François Devienne	Claudi Arimany and Russian Chamber Orchestra	Aurophon - CD 32172
1993	Complete Flute Concertos Vol. II	François Devienne	Claudi Arimany and Russian Chamber Orchestra	Aurophon - CD 32162
1990	Complete Flute Concertos Vol. I	François Devienne	Claude Arimany Symphonic Orchestra and Gdansk	Aurophon - CD 32002
1986	Virtuose der Flötenmusik Bach-Schüler	Carl Philipp Emanuel Bach, Johann Gottfried Müthel, Karl Friedrich Abel and Johann Philipp Kirnberger	Claude Arimany, Alexander Schmoller and Michael Gruber	Motette Ursina - CD 30141

== Notes ==
- Benito, Roberto (2003). "Claudi Arimany. La flauta, objecte de vocació concertística". Catalunya música: Revista musical catalana (in Catalan): 36–39. ISSN 1136-7458.
- Trullén, Louis (2004). "Claudi Arimany amb l'Orquestra de Cambra Franz Liszt, Robert King, Grigorij Sokolov, Eiji Oue, Till Ferner". Catalunya música: Revista musical catalana (in Catalan): 38–39. ISSN 1136-7458.
