= Louise Upton Brumback =

American artist and art activist (1867–1929)

- Born: January 17, 1867; Rochester, New York, US
- Died: February 22, 1929 (aged 62); Gloucester, Massachusetts, US
- Occupations: Artist; art activist
- Known for: Landscape painting

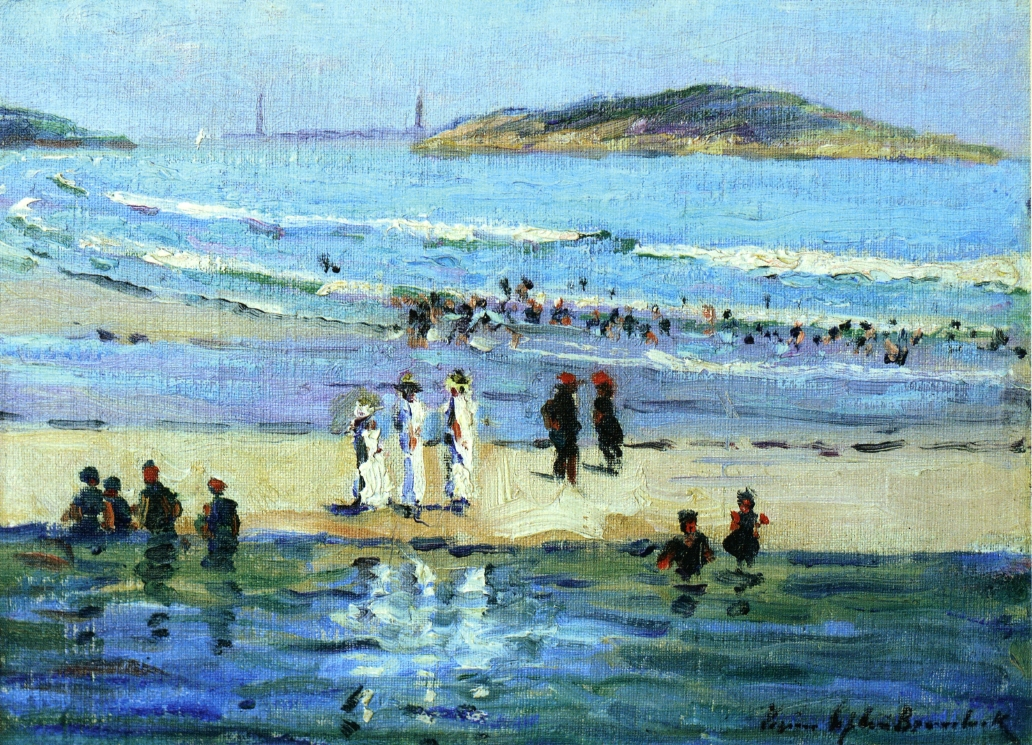
Louise Upton Brumback, Bathers Along the Shore, 1910, oil on panel, height: 25.4 cm (10 in.), width: 35.56 cm (14 in.)

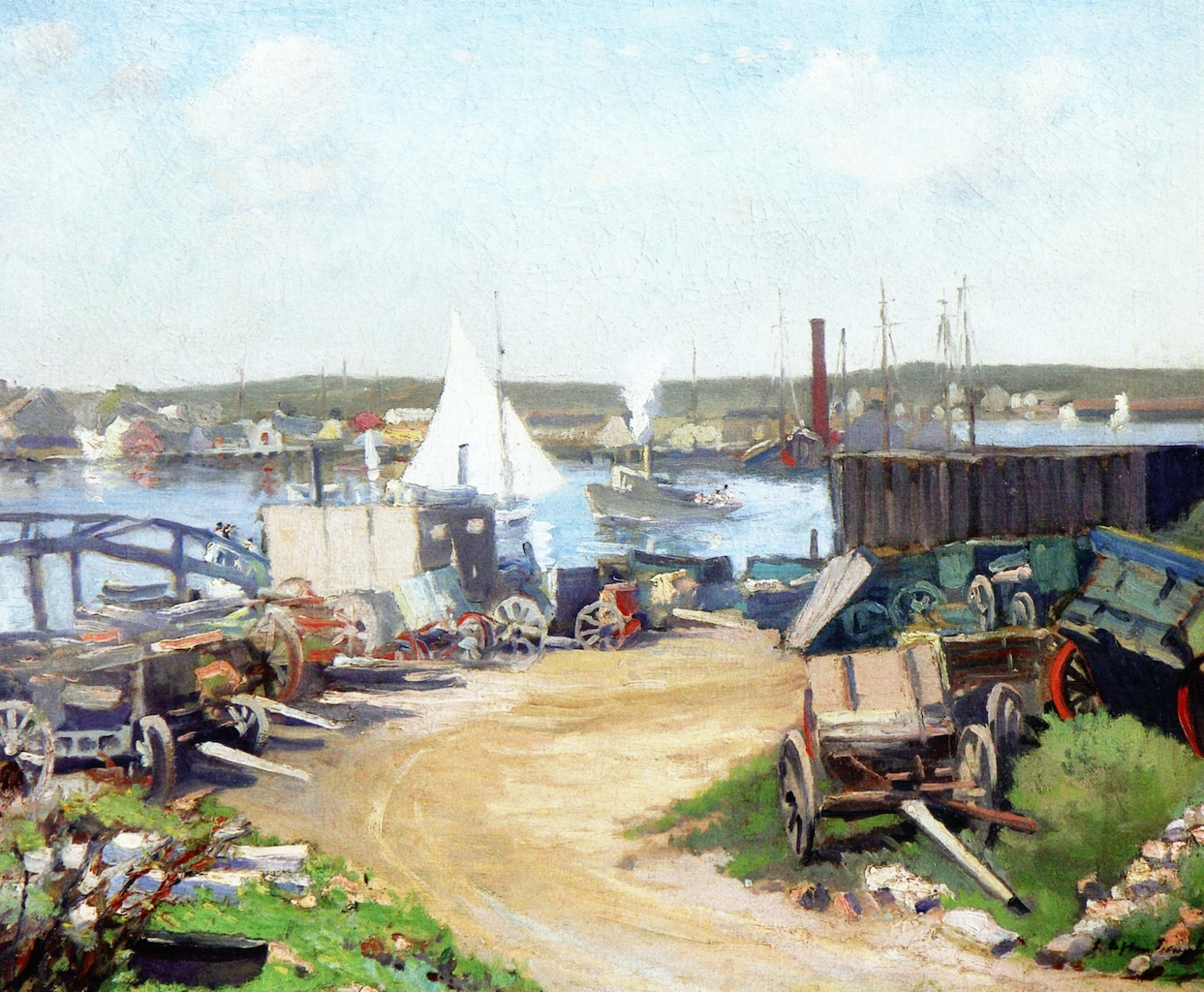
Louise Upton Brumback, Gloucester, Massachusetts, 1912, oil on canvas, height: 60.33 cm (23.75 in.), width: 72.39 cm (28.5 in.)

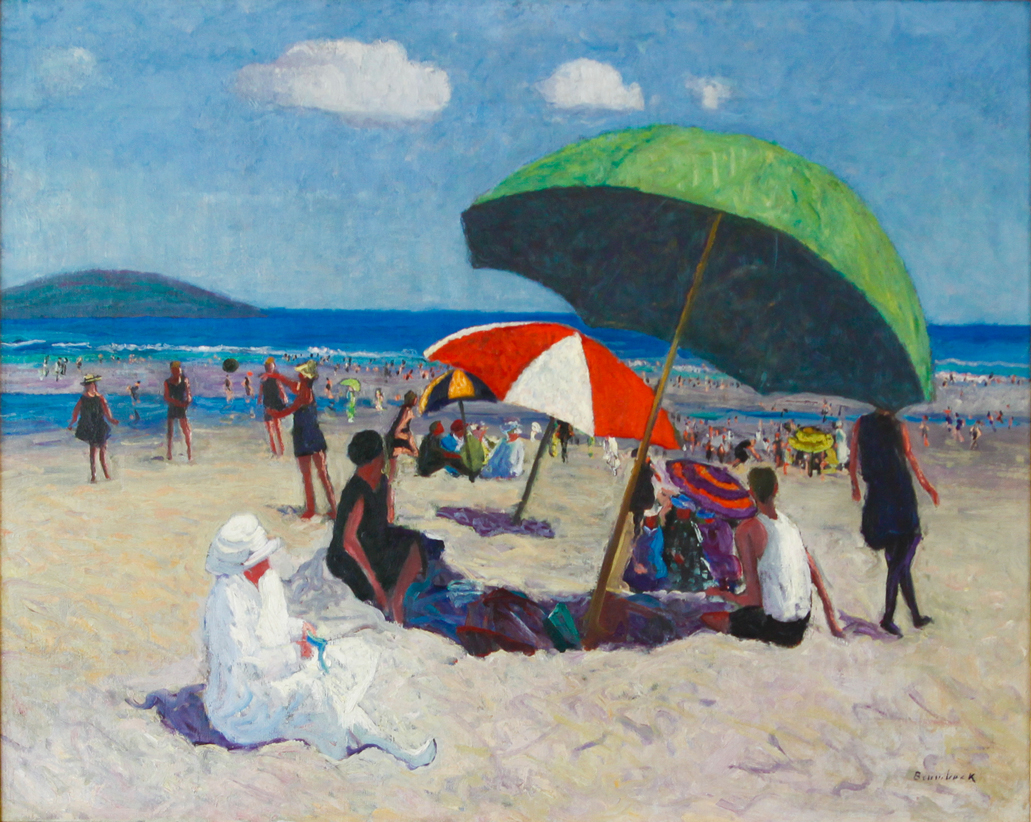
Louise Upton Brumback, Good Harbor Beach, 1915, oil on canvas, 23 1/2" x 27 1/2"

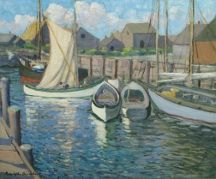
Louise Upton Brumback, At the Wharf, Cape Ann, Massachusetts, 1917, oil on canvas, 25" x 30"

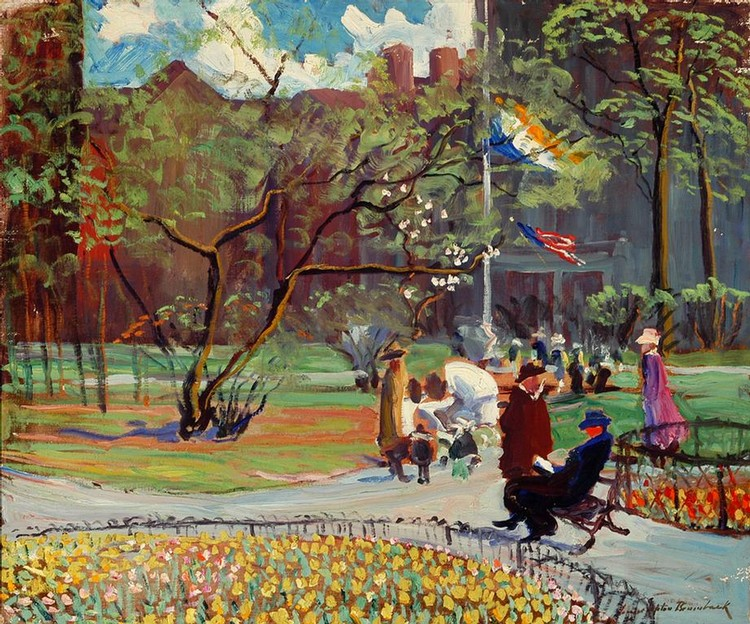
Louise Upton Brumback, May Day, Boston, 1918, oil on canvas, height: 64.8 cm. (25.5 in.), width: 76.2 cm. (30 in.)

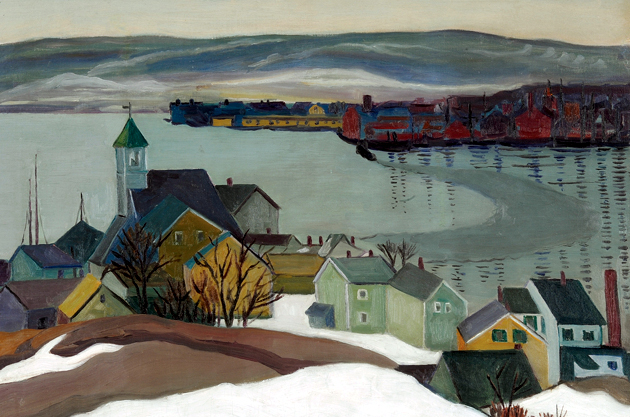
Louise Upton Brumback, Grey Day Gloucester, 1920, oil, Collection of Thomas Clark.

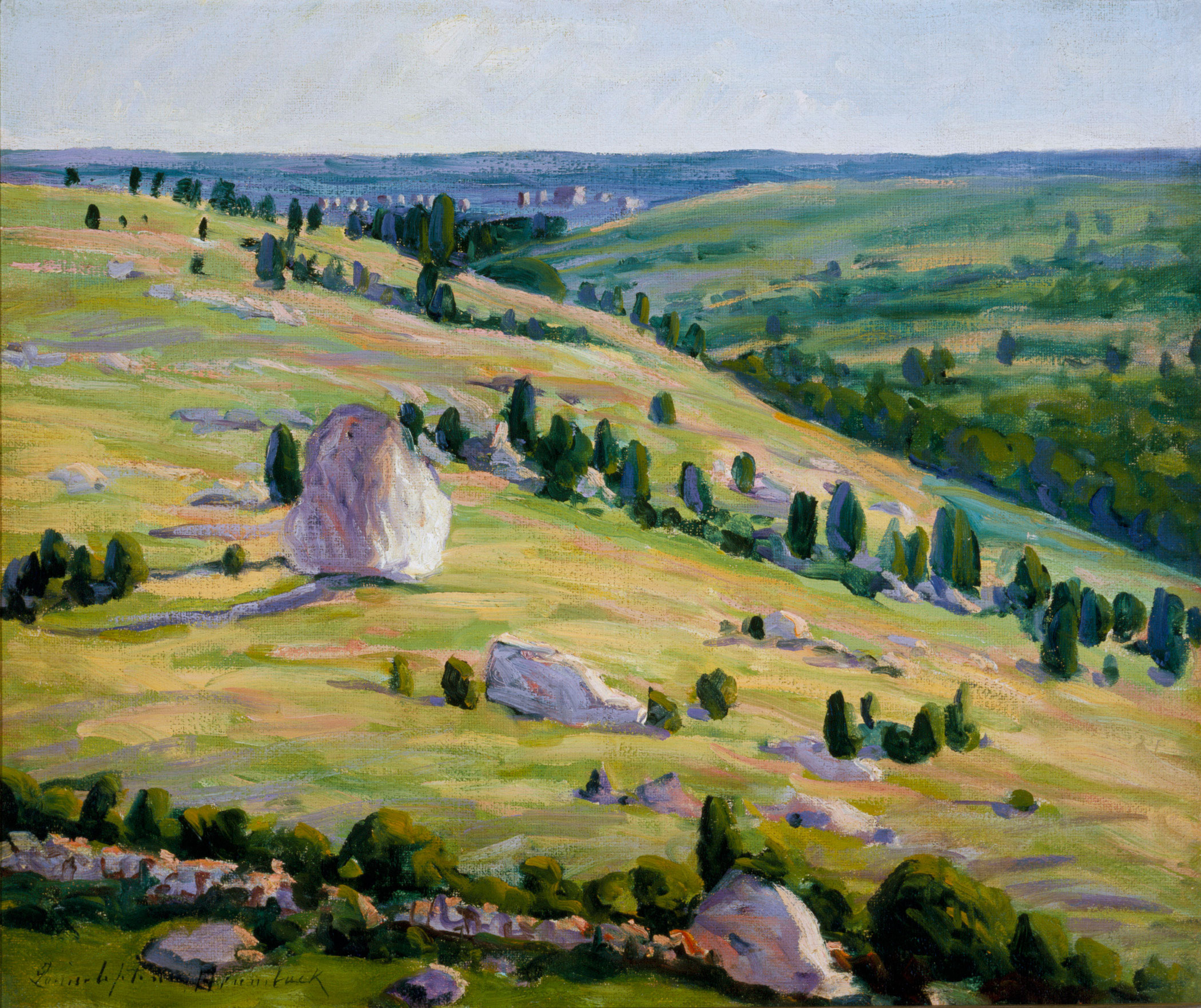
Louise Upton Brumback, Dogtown, Cape Ann, Massachusetts, 1920, oil on canvas, 25 x 30 inches

Louise Upton Brumback (January 17, 1867 – February 22, 1929) was an American artist and art activist known principally for her landscapes and marine scenes. Her paintings won praise from the critics and art collectors of her time. Writing at the height of her career, a newspaper critic praised her "firmness of character, quick vision, and directness of purpose." She said these traits "proved a solid rock upon which to build up an independent art expression which soon showed to men painters that they had a formidable rival." (Note: Here is the full quote: "Her art goes steadily ahead subject to the seriousness of her thought and her profound respect for nature. Her work is direct, free, and forceful, as representing an independent thinker and an impressive personality. She understands the harmonies of color, balance, rhythm, and composition, yet it is not these technical principles that are mainly manifest in her work, but a sterling quality of deep sincerity, natural talents cultivated by close application and keen observation as well as feeling and sentiment.") As art activist, she supported and led organizations devoted to supporting the work of under-appreciated painters, particularly women.

== Early life ==
On finishing high school in the late 1880s, Louise Upton Brumback first looked to a career in music, but soon turned her attention to painting. Her desire to become a professional artist may have been influenced by stories she had heard about her great-uncle, William Page, a highly regarded artist who had held the office of president of the National Academy of Design in the early 1870s. She undertook formal study at the age of 33 when she attended William Merritt Chase's school for plein air painting held in the summer months at Shinnecock Hills, Long Island.

She subsequently studied for a short time at Chase's New York School of Art and the Pennsylvania Academy of the Fine Arts, but principally developed her personal style through close study of the work of other artists both in New York and during travels within the United States. In 1923 she told an interviewer that she sought formal instruction only to learn good technique, believing that the best art showed the artist's individuality and skill of self-expression. She said painting such art cannot be learned in schools. "The great ones," she said, "won't teach their secrets, and the little ones have none to teach".

In pursuing her career, she obtained the unswerving support of her husband, whose success in the law permitted him to retire at an early age. This support gave her freedom to develop her talent unimpeded by financial need. Her own "firmness of character, quick vision, and directness of purpose" assured that she would apply herself intensely, with courage and originality (Note: "Her work is direct, free and forceful, as representing an independent thinker and an impressive personality".) in making paintings that would quickly be recognized for their "clear, forceful rendering, good drawing, and fine color work".

== Mature style ==
Having no need for the money that art sales would provide, Brumback rarely exhibited her paintings in private galleries and never competed for prizes. She preferred group shows to solo ones, and chose for the most part to participate in exhibitions held by clubs, societies, and other institutions of which she was a member or exhibitions held by museums and other public institutions.

The first show of her professional career was a group exhibition held in 1902 at the Art Club in Kansas City, Missouri, where she and her husband made their home. The two landscapes she contributed displayed her skill in creating atmospheric effects. The subject of the first, a peach orchard, was described as "rich with the hues of blossom time and bathed in a bright spring atmosphere", while the other, a forest scene called The Beeches, was seen to possess "the same luminous atmospheric effects". (Note: "Mrs. Louise Upton Brumback exhibited two landscapes so utterly unlike in theme and execution as to be a fair test of her versatility. One depicted a peach orchard, rich with the hues of blossom time and bathed in a bright spring atmosphere. The other, entitled 'The Beeches,' was a forest scene, with giant trees in the immediate foreground and other tree masses in the distance, this canvas being characterized by the same luminous atmospheric effects as the other. In point of clear, forceful rendering, good drawing, and fine color work, these two pictures were second to none in the exhibition. Mrs. Brumback [has] a rare ability to obtain luminous atmospheric effects".) In the early years of the twentieth century, she frequently traveled to New York City, and in 1905 she provided a painting called Moonrise to a group exhibition at the National Academy of Design. Over the next fifteen years, she would exhibit another ten times at the National Academy.

About 1909 Brumback began spending most of the cooler months of the year in Manhattan and the warmer months in the seaside resort and artists' colony in Gloucester, Massachusetts. Brumback at first rented studio space in both locations but, while continuing to rent in New York, in 1912 she and her husband bought land and built a house in East Gloucester which they called the "House on the Hill". (Note: "They were summer residents of East Gloucester, Massachusetts where in 1912, they acquired about 10 acres of land on Sunset Hill near Rocky Pasture Road".) (Note: The American Art Annual for 1915 listed Brumback's three addresses: Permanent: 500 East 36th St. Kansas City, Missouri; Summer: The House on the Hill, Gloucester, Massachusetts; Also: 140 West 57th St, New York.) That year, she showed three landscapes at the Twenty-third Annual Exhibition of the New York Watercolor Club. She also contributed a picture, called Little Red Boat, to a group show of contemporary American painting at the Corcoran Gallery. The critic for a local paper called her work "sincere, frank and sympathetic", and said Brumback, although "by no means well known", was "rapidly gaining recognition". The following year, her work appeared in one of her few solo appearances in a New York gallery when she contributed 29 landscapes and marines to a show at the Folsom Galleries. (Note: In reviewing this show the art critic for the New York Herald wrote that "Mrs. Brumback is a Kansas City woman, but she has a summer home at Gloucester, Mass., and the pictures in the present exhibition nearly all were painted there last summer. She is most successful in pictures in which water appears as a theme. The best is Gloucester, a hazy view of the city from across the bay, with a splendid rendition of distance. Across the Sand is another work of rare quality, conveying the feeling of the beach", and the critic for the New York Press said "those who admire courage will find much to please them in her exhibition".)

In 1914, after a decade of few appearances, Brumback began to place her paintings in group, duo, and solo exhibitions. That year, she showed at the National Academy of Design and the Art Institute of Chicago, as well as another Corcoran show; a solo show at the Fine Arts Institute, Kansas City, and a dual-show with M. Bradish Titcomb at the Copley Gallery, Boston, Massachusetts. The trend continued during the next few years, with a solo show at the Petrus Stuyvesant Club, New York, in 1916 and group shows over the next three years: (1) in 1915 at the National Academy of Design, Macbeth Galleries in New York, the Association of Women Painters and Sculptors exhibition at Arlington Galleries in New York, Pennsylvania Academy of the Fine Arts, and the Fine Arts Institute, Kansas City, (2) in 1916 at the Gallery on the Moors, Gloucester, and the Art Institute of Chicago; and (3) in 1917 at the National Academy of Design, the National Arts Club, the Gallery on the Moors, the First Annual Exhibition of the Society of Independent Artists, Grand Central Palace, New York, and the Chatauqua Institution in the city of that name (New York).

By this time her paintings were becoming famous and she was credited with being one of the best women painters of the time. Her work drew praise for its strong brushwork, excellent composition, and rich, glowing color, clean palette and vigorous handling, and clear, straightforward presentation of its subjects. Although two critics said draftsmanship of her work was crude and the "tone" needed refining, most gave her unreserved praise and one, obliquely suggesting why a conservative critic might withhold find fault, said she belonged to "the left wing of New York's feminine talent".

In 1918 and 1919 she embarked on the first of several trips to California where she painted Pacific Coast scenes. Writing in July 1919, a critic said of these and earlier paintings that Brumback's work was virile and energetic. In 1921, when the West Coast pictures appeared in a show at Buffalo's Albright Art Gallery, a local critic said they were "characterized by her great versatility and variety of subject matter — still life, the seashore, clouds, snow, forests, mountains—each treated in a different manner" and of one in particular, "a daring essay...there is movement, even excitement, in the canvas, brought out by the opposition of the lines, but chiefly by the opposition of the complementary colors".

With the exception of some floral arrangements, Brumback did not paint interiors or urban scenes. Working out of doors in rural settings, she sought to capture the subjective feeling of a scene, its "mood of nature," as she put it, however much time and effort it might take to achieve that goal. While praising the "strong, clean palette and vigorous handling" in her landscapes and marines, one critic noted that her success derived from knowing what to leave out of a picture as well as what to put in it. (Note: "The sea and its harbors, fruit trees in bloom, gardens filled with flowing shrubs, bouquets in jugs, [are] all subjects asking for a strong, clean palette and vigorous handling. Mrs. Brummback sees her handsome world with a direct vision and no nonsense in her mind. She works for those things that may be grasped by a clear intelligence, and where sentiment is introduced it is the sentiment of the morning on a day washed by early rain. No mists, no fogs, no blinding midday sun, nothing to interfere with clarity. It is very little wonder that her work appeals to the American public.)

In 1927, when Brumback turned 60, her skill and her appetite for hard work remained undiminished. (Note: Regarding her capacity for hard work, a critic had noted in 1919 that "She attributes her success as an artist to her application of the three rules of golf: first keep your eye on the ball; second, keep your eye on the ball; third, keep your eye on the ball. With her, it is hard work, hard work, and more hard work—not unintelligent pegging away, but thoughtful research".) The art reporter for the New York Evening Post praised a solo exhibition of that year for the subtlety and rhythm of the flower paintings and landscapes in oil and watercolor that it contained, and the reporter for the Times drew attention to the painting Gloucester in Winter in this show for its success in evoking a mood: the charm of a coastal resort that "flees with the opening of the Summer hotels".

== Art activist ==
As an artist, Brumback was viewed as energetic, forceful, virile, and direct. (Note: This is one example of many critical notices that attribute these characteristics to her: "Following her natural bent for directness and breadth, she put her subjects on canvas in that forceful, convincing manner that is so integrally a part of herself. She has strong opinions about all art matters, studies carefully every form of expression and rules and makes her decisions as to what is best for the ultimate advancement of art in general.") Deploying these character traits as an activist, she became a strong advocate for artists and of democratic principles within the art world. In 1922 she became president of a new society of artists—The Gloucester Society of Artists—devoted to exhibiting work without prior selection by juries. She believed that juries unfairly prevented good art from being seen, particularly art made by women, and, that, by skewing public taste, they inhibited young artists from developing their creative potential. (Note: Describing the new society a reporter said "the liberals, or 'liberal-minded conservatives' as they prefer to be called, organized the Gloucester Society of Artists, electing Louise Upton Brumback president. The Society was formed after a "group of artists met at Grace Horne’s more avant-garde gallery... Brumback was elected president, and the art committee included Stuart Davis and Alice Beach Winter. It provided a "large gallery, restaurant, bathing beach, tennis, croquet, all available to members." At the same time another art group was formed in Gloucester, the North Shore Arts Association, having similar ideals but taking a somewhat more conservative approach. Brumback became a member of that organization as well.) That year she also opened a gallery in her New York apartment both to show her own work, on occasion, and to show the work of other artists who she believed deserved greater exposure. In 1925 she became a founding member of the New York Society of Women Artists and participated in its annual shows up to the time of her death. Like the Gloucester society, this one believed in exhibiting with no jury. It also decided that each member should get the same amount of space to display her work and that the membership would be limited to 30 painters and sculptors.

== Exhibitions ==
Brumback exhibited her work in private galleries, shows of the societies of which she was a member, and public institutions such as the National Academy of Design, Corcoran Gallery of Art, Pennsylvania Academy, Albright Gallery, Art Institute of Chicago, Newark Museum, and the Museum of the Omaha Society of Fine Arts, Omaha, Nebraska. She also showed at the Panama–Pacific International Exposition of San Francisco in 1915.

She participated in a large number of group and solo exhibitions. Solo exhibitions included shows at the Folson Gallery (1913, New York), Fine Arts Institute (1914, Kansas City, Mo.), Petrus Stuyvesant Club (1916, New York), Albright Art Gallery (1920, Buffalo, N.Y.), Woman's City Club (1922, Kansas City, Mo.), Art Institute of Chicago (1921), Memorial Art Gallery (1921, Rochester, N.Y.), Knoedler Galleries (1921, New York), Mrs. Sterner's Gallery (1922, New York), Painters and Sculptors Gallery (1926, New York), Marie Sterner's Art Patrons of America (1927, New York). Her participation in group shows included repeated appearances with the Art Institute of Chicago, Association of Women Painters and Sculptors, Corcoran Gallery (Washington, D.C.), Gallery on the Moors (Gloucester, Mass.), Gloucester Society of Artists, MacDowell Club Galleries, National Academy of Design, National Association of Women Painters and Sculptors, New York Society of Women Artists, Pen and Brush Club, and Pennsylvania Academy of Fine Arts (Philadelphia, Penn.). (Note: This brief summary of Brumback's appearances in solo and group shows comes from notices in contemporary newspapers, art magazines, and published catalogs. Where a city is not named it is either obvious from context or is New York.)

== Memberships ==
Brumback belonged to the American Federation of Arts, Art Association of Gloucester, Memorial Art Gallery (Rochester, New York), National Arts Club, National Association of Women Painters and Sculptors, New York Society of Women Artists, Pen and Brush Club, Salons of America, and Society of Independent Artists. (Note: This representative list of memberships comes from the American Art Annual, Buffalo Courier, Rochester Democrat, Clifton Springs Press, and an art reference website. If a city is not named, the location is New York.)

== Personal life ==
Brumback became a painter after her marriage in 1891 and consistently used Louise Upton Brumback as her professional name. Her married name, Mrs. Frank Brumback, appeared only in newspapers' society notices. Various truncations and misspellings of her name appeared from time to time. The most common was the rendering her last name as "Brumbach" as in "Louise Upton Brumbach" or, in one case, "L.M. Brumbach."

She was born in Rochester, New York, on January 17. There is disagreement about the year of her birth. Although references published since 1900 give 1872, sources from earlier years give 1867. Census reports for 1870, 1875, and 1880 give her birth year as 1867; her gravestone gives that year; and a genealogy published in 1900 gives it as well. The earliest source giving a later birth date is the United States Census of 1900 which lists her age as 29 with a presumptive birth year of 1871 or 1872.

=== Parents ===
Brumback's parents were Charles E. Upton and Louise Rackett Upton. They were sufficiently prominent that the large house in which they lived stood on the corner of a street, Upton Park, named after them. (Note: Listed in the Historic American Buildings Survey, the house is located at 666 East Avenue, at the northeast corner of East Avenue and Upton Park. It was constructed between 1852 and 1854 for Mr. and Mrs. Charles Perkins Bissell. Charles E. Upton bought it April 1, 1867, shortly after Brumback's birth and sold it 20 years later to help pay his debts.) Brumback's siblings included an older sister, Annie Upton (born 1860), a brother, George Rackett Upton (born 1863), and a twin sister, Alice. Following the death of George in 1866, her parents adopted a cousin, Charles F. Gorrard (also known as Charles Torrance) born in 1859), as their son.

Her father was a banker and speculator in commodities and stocks. In December 1882 he embezzled large sums from a bank he owned in an effort to cover a huge loss he had incurred in a speculation on the price of oil. The bank failed when it became known that Upton would be unable to repay the money he had taken. Convicted of embezzlement in 1883, he died in 1886 while an appeal was pending. Brumback's mother was Louise Rackett Upton, author of a novel, Castles in the Air (New York, G. P. Putnam's Sons, 1879).

=== Education ===
At an early age Louise and her twin sister Alice were sent to Mrs. Sylvanus Reed's School, a boarding school in New York City that had a curriculum of sufficient rigor that graduates could pass the examinations for entrance to Columbia College. (Note: Although women could not become students in Columbia College until 1983, the preparation they received at Mrs. Sylvanus Reed's School gave them a firm grounding in modern and ancient languages, fine arts, geography, biology, and mathematics, including trigonometry and calculus.) Established in 1864 the school was run by Caroline Gallup Reed, widow of the Rev. Sylvanus Reed. Upon leaving it, Brumback enrolled in one of New York's conservatories of music. (Note: When Brumback was young, New York City had several conservatories of music. The one she attended may have been Ernest G. Eberhard's Grand Conservatory of Music at 46 West 23rd Street in New York, a prominent co-educational school of the time which taught drawing and painting as well as music and the dramatic arts.)

=== Move to Kansas City and marriage ===
In 1889 Louise Rackett Upton Brumback and her two daughters moved from New York to Kansas City and on June 11, 1891, Brumback married Frank Fullerton Brumback, a prominent attorney in Kansas City, Missouri, and son of the prominent Kansas Citian judge Jefferson Brumback. (Note: Frank Brumback wrote a legal treatise, a Christmas story, and a popular song. The treatise is "Today and Yesterday," American Law Review (vol. 50, March 1916, pp. 248–61). The story is "The Deserted Kingdom, a Christmas Ghost Story", Outing: Sport, Adventure, Travel, Fiction (Vol. 21, No. 4, January 1893, pp. 282–86).) The couple had one child, Jefferson Upton Brumback. He was killed in flight while serving as a lieutenant in the U.S. Army Air Service. In 1921 Brumback donated a painting called Fair and Cooler to the Memorial Art Gallery in Rochester in memory of her son.

Brumback and her husband participated in the well-heeled society of Kansas City at the end of the nineteenth century and into the twentieth. She sponsored parties, such as one held in 1896 at Kansas City's Lyceum Hall, participated in musical entertainments, such as one written by her sister Alice that same year, and she herself wrote an operetta that was performed at a local club the following year. In early 1900’s Brumback and her husband and son lived in a mansion on 4019 Warwick boulevard in Kansas City. In 1909 Brumback and her husband built a larger house, designed by Louis Curtiss, (Note: Located at 500 E. 36th Street in Kansas City, this colonial revival style house still remained in 2007.) and she drew murals in its rooms showing scenes of Gloucester much like her easel paintings. (Note: Brumback's murals were described in an article that appeared in 1919: "The charms of this New England resort have been transferred to the walls of the artist's Kansas City home in a nice bit of mural decoration. Instead of re-papering a room, this clever little artist dashed her paint pots on its walls, sketching on one, the view from the east window of her Gloucester cottage at sunrise; on another she did the harbor with its picturesque boats and the fishermen; and on the west, over the mantle, she has a charming beach scene with its bathers, pink umbrellas, and yellow sand. The last view is of the village on a misty moonlight night.") Soon after the house was completed, Frank Brumback retired from legal practice and, as already noted, thereafter gave full support to Brumback's professional career. In 1920 they leased the house for an indefinite period and spent all their time in Gloucester, Manhattan, and in travel.

Brumback died at the age of 62 in Gloucester, Massachusetts, on February 22, 1929.
