= Variations on "Trockne Blumen" =

1824 composition by Franz Schubert

- by Franz Schubert
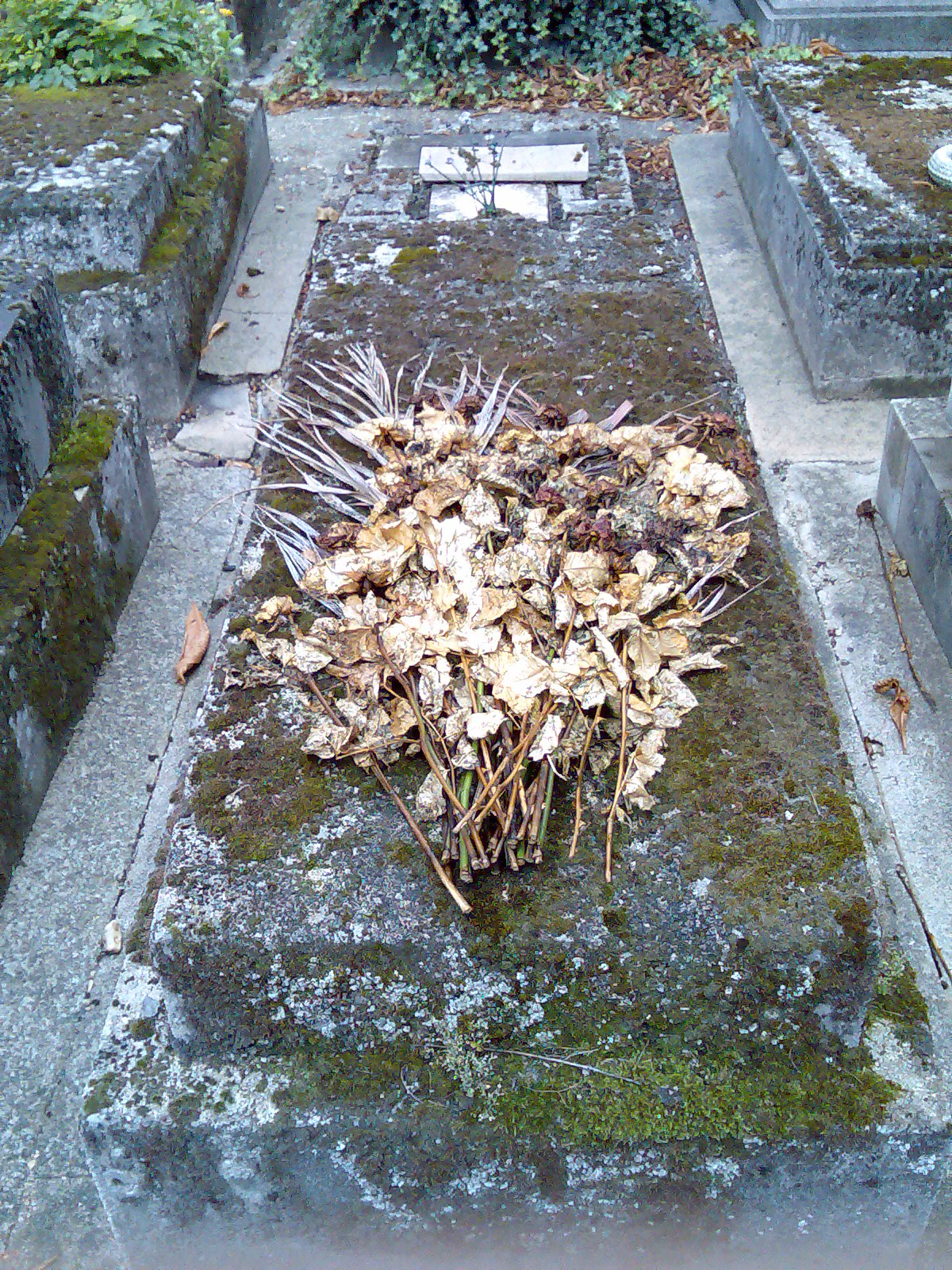
- Dried flowers atop a grave
- Key: E minor
- Catalogue: D 802
- Opus: 160 (posthumous)
- Composed: 1824
- Performed: 1862
- Published: 1850
- Scoring: flute and piano

Franz Schubert's Variations on "Trockne Blumen" for flute and piano, D 802, Op. posth. 160, is a work in E minor written in January 1824. It is a set of variations on the 18th Lied of his song cycle Die schöne Müllerin (D 795), "Trockne Blumen" ("Dry Flowers"). It was published in April 1850, almost 21 years after Schubert's death, and had its first documented performance in 1862 by the flautist Franz Doppler.

== Background ==
Considered one of the most important 19th-century works for the flute, it was written while Schubert was suffering from a relapse of the syphilis he contracted exactly one year prior. Schubert likely wrote the work for Ferdinand Bogner, a professor at the Vienna Conservatory, with whom Schubert played in an amateur orchestra for which he wrote his first symphonies. The piece, written before Die schöne Müllerin was even published, was itself not published until April 1850 by Anton Diabelli's firm, and received its first known performance in 1862 by Franz Doppler. The autograph survives and is housed in the Wienbibliothek im Rathaus.

== Music ==
The piece, highly demanding for both instruments, begins with a "large-scale" introduction before the first statement of the theme and seven subsequent variations. A typical performance takes about 19 minutes. The variations are noted to differ significantly in character and affect from the original song; according to musicologist Lawrence M. Zbikowski, "Schubert's variations make scant reference to the sombre and tortured emotions of the song, and are soon overtaken by the high spirits of virtuosic play between the instruments".

== Recordings ==
The variations have been recorded by, among others, Jean-Pierre Rampal with Robert Veyron-Lacroix, Louis Moyse with John Buttrick, Emmanuel Pahud with Éric Le Sage, and János Bálint with Zoltán Kocsis. The variations have sometimes been performed with violin substituting for the flute, for instance by Gidon Kremer, who performed it with András Schiff at a 1982 Salzburg Festival concert and recorded them with Oleg Maisenberg in 1993 for Deutsche Grammophon.
