= Árpád Doppler =

Hungarian-German composer (1857–1927)

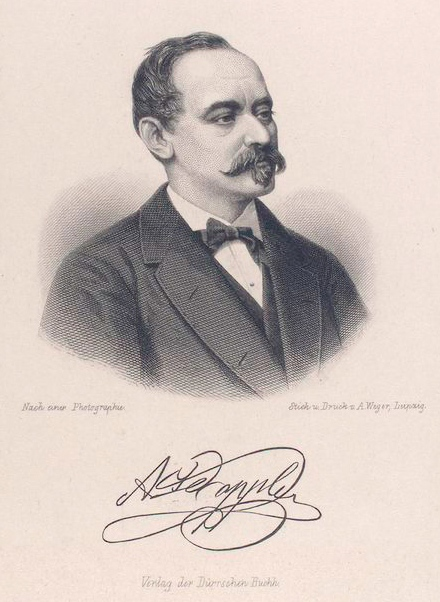
- Born: 5 June 1857; Budapest
- Died: 13 August 1927 (aged 70); Stuttgart
- Parent: Karl Doppler

Árpád Doppler (5 June 1857 – 13 August 1927) was a Hungarian-German composer.

He was born in Budapest, the son of Karl Doppler, and he studied at the Conservatory of Stuttgart. From 1880 to 1883 he was a teacher at the Grand Conservatory in New York City, after which he returned to the German Empire in order to teach at the Conservatory in Stuttgart. From 1889, he was also a choir leader at the court opera in Stuttgart.

He composed several works for piano and for orchestra, choral works, lieder, and operas. His comic opera Halixula was first performed in 1891 at the court opera in Stuttgart; Viel Lärm um Nichts, based on Much Ado about Nothing, had its first performance in Leipzig in 1896.

His compositional style is reminiscent at times of Edvard Grieg.

He died in Stuttgart in 1927.
