= Karl Doppler =

Hungarian flute virtuoso, conductor, music director, composer

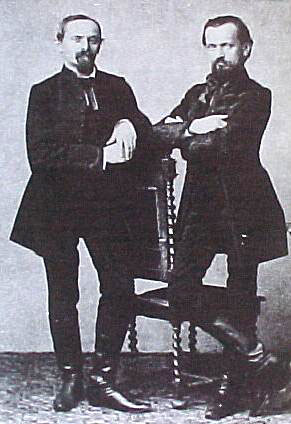
Franz and Karl Doppler

Karl Doppler (12 September 1825, Lemberg – 10 March 1900, Stuttgart) was a Hungarian flute virtuoso, conductor, music director, composer. He was the younger brother of the composer Franz Doppler and father of the composer Árpád Doppler.

He worked until 1865 as music director at the Theater in Budapest, and from 1865 to 1898 as the Hofkapellmeister in Stuttgart. He composed several Hungarian operas, a collection of Hungarian folk dances and choirs.

== Works ==
- A gránátos tábor, 1853 (The Grenadier Camp)
