= Shigenori Kudo =

Japanese flutist (born 1954)

- Born: September 26, 1954 (age 71); Sapporo, Japan
- Genres: Classical
- Occupations: Musician, professor
- Instrument: Flute

Shigenori Kudo (工藤 重典, Kudō Shigenori; born September 26, 1954) is a Japanese flutist.

== Career ==
Kudo began playing the flute at age 10 and studied under Souichi Minegishi at the Toho Gakuen School of Music. He later studied at the Conservatoire National de Paris under Jean-Pierre Rampal.

In 1978, he won the second Paris International Flute Competition. He also won the Jean-Pierre Rampal International Flute Competition in 1980, simultaneously earning the Prix du President de la Republique.

He has performed under various conductors, including Seiji Ozawa, Krzysztof Penderecki, Ferdinand Leitner, and Leonard Slatkin. He has also played with orchestras including Saito Kinen Orchestra, Bavarian Radio Symphony Orchestra, and Wiener Kammerorchester.

He lives in France and teaches at École Normale de Musique de Paris. His students include South African soloist Liesl Stoltz and fellow Japanese flutist Yuko Enomoto.

In 2026, he performed as a soloist with the Vietnam National Symphony Orchestra.
