= John Steele Ritter =

American musician

John Steele Ritter is an American classical keyboardist and teacher.

Born and raised in Many, Louisiana, a graduate of the Curtis Institute of Music in Philadelphia, he went on to graduate studies at the University of Southern California. In 1963, he became Professor of Music at Pomona College, a post which he held until 1991.

From 1972–74, Ritter performed with the Los Angeles Philharmonic, and in 1975 commenced his long-standing association with French flautist Jean-Pierre Rampal, when Rampal's former accompanist, Robert Veyron-Lacroix began suffering from ill health; he made a tour to Japan with Rampal. Since 1983, he has also performed with oboist Heinz Holliger.

He has recorded on several labels, and has made 11 classical CDs, some with Rampal, including Rameau: Pieces de Clavecin en Concerts avec flute et violon (which also included Isaac Stern). Currently, he is teaching as an adjunct faculty member at the College Conservatory of Music in Cincinnati, Ohio.
