= Franz Doppler =

Austrian musician (1821–1883)

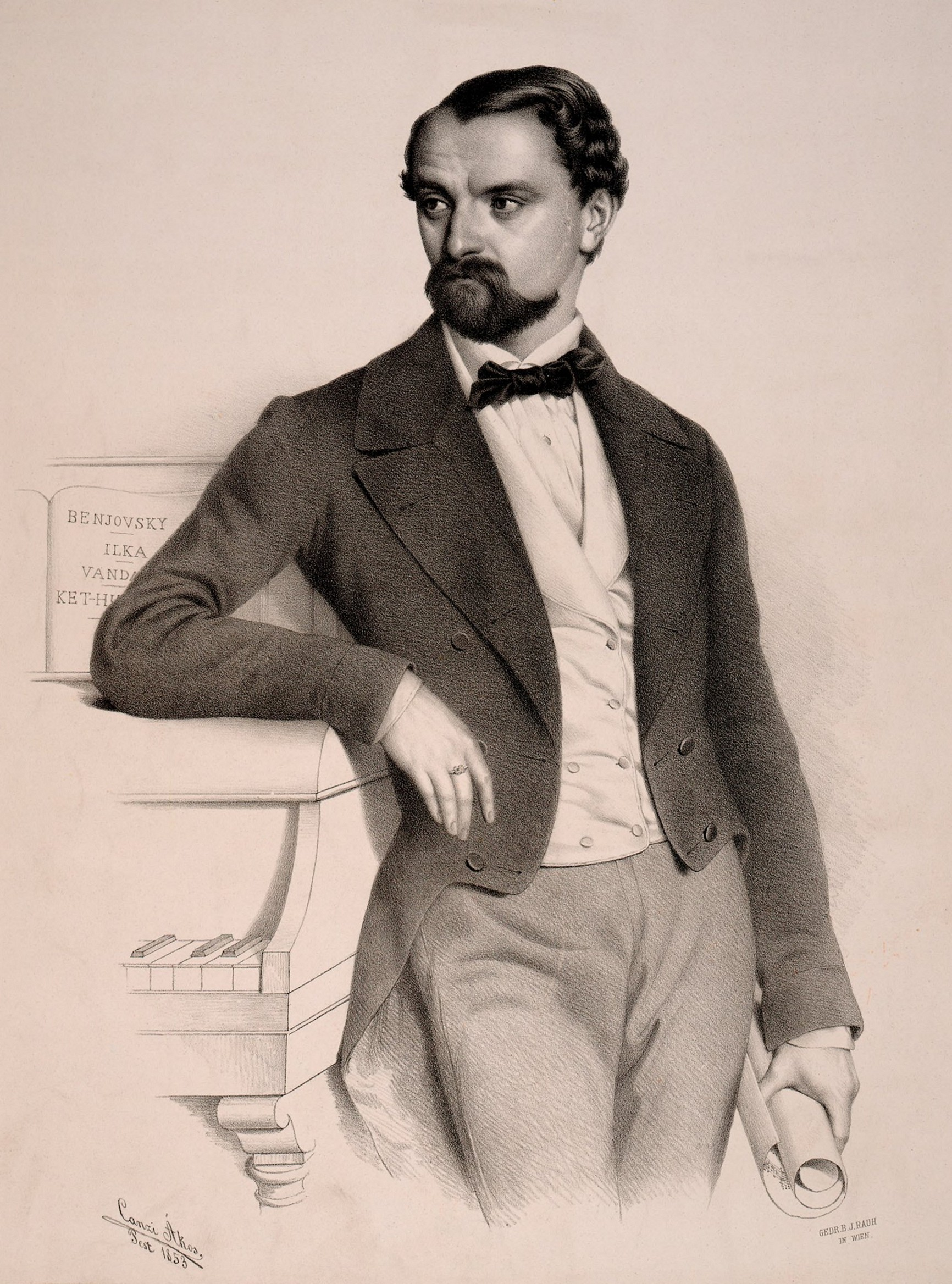
Franz Doppler, 1853

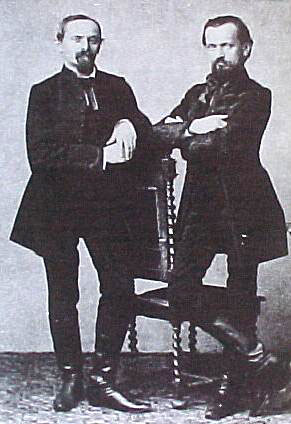
Franz and Karl Doppler

Albert Franz Doppler (16 October 1821 – 27 July 1883) was a flute virtuoso and a composer best known for his flute music. He also wrote one German and several Hungarian operas for Budapest, all produced with great success. His ballet music was popular during his lifetime.

== Life ==
Doppler was born in Lemberg (Austrian Empire), now Lviv, Ukraine. From 1828 to 1831, he received flute lessons from his father, Joseph Doppler, who was an oboist, and made his debut as a flautist at the age of 13. He formed a flute duo with his brother Karl, four years younger, who mainly wrote songs and incidental music, and as a duo they caused quite a sensation throughout Europe. They toured and both became members of the orchestra of the German Theatre, Budapest, in 1838 and both moved to the Hungarian National Theatre in 1841. There, five of Franz's operas were staged with success. Franz and Karl continued to make regular tours of Europe and helped found the Hungarian Philharmonic Orchestra in 1853. At the age of 18 Franz was the first flautist at the opera in Budapest, and he went on to be the first flautist and stand-in conductor and eventually chief conductor, of the Vienna Court Opera, as well as acquiring a position of Professor of Flute in the Vienna Conservatoire from 1864 until 1867. He died at Baden bei Wien, Austria.

Doppler composed chiefly for the flute, as well as opera (a style that is prominent even in his showpieces for flute), composing many pieces including concertos, showpieces, and many flute duets, to be played by himself and his brother Karl. His music contains aspects of Russian and Hungarian music. His operas included Judith (his only German opera), and a Russian work entitled Benyovsky. He wrote seven operas and fifteen ballets in total (which were quite popular in their time) and was a brilliant orchestrator.

He is also known for the orchestral arrangements of six of Franz Liszt's Hungarian Rhapsodies published under his name. He was a student of Liszt, and Liszt set Doppler the exercise of orchestrating six Rhapsodies. Every single bar of these orchestrations was revised by Liszt upon publication, but he allowed Doppler's name to remain on the title page. (Liszt frequently collaborated with his students in this way which gave rise to the notion that he did not or could not orchestrate his own works)

== Selected works ==
Stage works

- Benyovszky vagy A kamcsatkai számuzött (Benyovsky, or the Changeling from Kamchatka), opera after August von Kotzebue, 1847
- Ilka és a huszártoborzó (Ilka and the Hussar Recruitment), comic opera, 1849
- Wanda, opera, 1853
- Két huszár (The Two Hussars), opera, 1853
- Salvator Rosa, melodrama, 1855
- Erzsébet opera, (Overture and Act I. Act II by Ferenc Erkel, Act III by Karl Doppler), 1857
- Judith opera, 1870

Other

- Airs Valaques, Op. 10
- Berceuse, Op. 15
- Mazurka de salon, Op. 16
- Nocturne, Op. 17
- Andante et Rondo, Op. 25 (for two flutes and a piano) 1870
- Fantaisie pastorale hongroise, Op. 26
- Souvenir du Rigi, Op. 34
