= Ernest G. Eberhard =

- Born: May 30, 1839; Kingdom of Hanover
- Died: January 16, 1910 (aged 70); New York City
- Education: educated in Europe
- Occupations: College president, author, journalist, publisher, music teacher, organist, composer, conductor
- Spouse: Caroline Louise Bogert
- Children: Mrs. Edward Lansing; Mrs. Howard Hyde; Beatrice Eberhard; Ernest G. Eberhard.
- Writing career
- Language: English

Ernest G. Eberhard (May 30, 1839 - January 16, 1910) was a German immigrant who founded the Grand Conservatory of New York City, of which he was president for about 40 years. He was also an organist, conductor of choral societies and orchestras, author of musical instruction books and a publisher.

Eberhard founded the Grand Conservatory in 1874, with some help from the New York State Legislature. At a graduation ceremony, Theodore Roosevelt (then a state congressman), admitted to being involved in the legislation which allowed the conservatory to offer a Musical Doctor degree. Ernst Eberhard was the first to receive the doctorate.

== Family ==
Eberhard married Caroline Louise Bogert in New York City, June 1876. Their children were Mrs. Edward Lansing, Mrs. Howard Hyde, Beatrice Eberhard ("well known violin virtuoso"), and Ernest G. Eberhard.

== Books ==
- Method for Piano, Course of Studies and Course in Technics (17 books)
- Harmony and Counterpoint Simplified

== Organist in ==
- St Ann's Church, Brooklyn
- Paulist Church, New York City
- First Baptist Church, Manhattan

== Conductor of ==
- Newark Philharmonic Society

== Director of ==
- Parlor Opera Company
- Student Concert Company

== Newspaper correspondent ==
- The Presto, Chicago
- The American Israelite, Cincinnati

== Clubs and associations ==
- New York State Historical Association
- New York Economic Club
- Freemasonry
