= Eagle-bone whistle =

Native American religious musical instrument

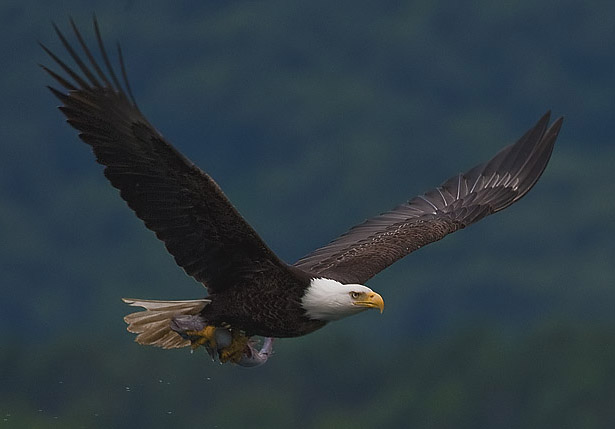
Bald eagle

The eagle bone whistle is a religious object that is used by some members of Native American spiritual societies in sacred ceremonies. They are made from bones of either the American bald eagle or the American golden eagle, and are considered powerful spiritual objects.

== Use ==
Eagle bone whistles are used in many ceremonies of various American Indigenous cultures. The eagle bone whistle may be considered as a ceremonial or sacred object which may not be considered a musical instrument, if music is defined as entertainment: "There is no time or need...to wallow in distinctions between a feather-and-bone raptor and a bone whistle avian mysticism; one would no doubt end in dichotomous Western readings thereof."

The whistle is used in some Peyote ceremonies of some sects of the Native American Church. Eagle bone whistles are used in a number of Sun Dance cultures, such as the Crow. The eagle-bone whistle is also used by the Lakota people in certain ceremonies, such as some Sun Dances.

Navajo/Ute flutist R. Carlos Nakai claims to use an "eagle-bone whistle" on multiple albums.

== Federal law ==
Both the bald and golden eagle are protected by federal law: the Migratory Bird Treaty Act of 1918 (MBTA) prohibits the taking, killing, possession, transportation, and importation of migratory birds, their eggs, parts, and nests except as authorized under a valid permit as outlined at 50 CFR 21.11 The MBTA authorizes and directs the Secretary of the Interior to determine if, and by what means, the hunting of migratory birds should be allowed, as well as to adopt and implement suitable regulations permitting and governing the hunting of any type of migratory bird (for example, hunting seasons for ducks and geese). The Eagle feather law is another name for the exemptions to this act that are sometimes granted to enrolled members of federally recognized Native American tribes. Penalties under the MBTA include a maximum of two years imprisonment and $250,000 fine for a felony conviction and six months imprisonment or $5,000 fine for a misdemeanor conviction. Fines double if the violator is an organization rather than an individual. These laws would also apply to the collection and use of eagle bone whistles.

== See also ==
- Eagles in culture
