= WFS =

WFS may stand for:

- Wave field synthesis
- Web Feature Service, a standard protocol for serving georeferenced map data over the Internet
- Well-founded semantics
- Wells Fargo Securities
- William French Smith
- Wilmington Friends School
- Windows Fax and Scan
- Women for Sobriety
- World Flute Society
- World Food Summit
- World Fuel Services
- World Future Society
- Worldwide Flight Services, a global, world-leading air cargo, passenger & ground handling organisation.
- Wright Flyer Studios (WFS, Inc.), a Japanese mobile game developer
