= Eagle feather law =

US law allowing access to eagle feathers

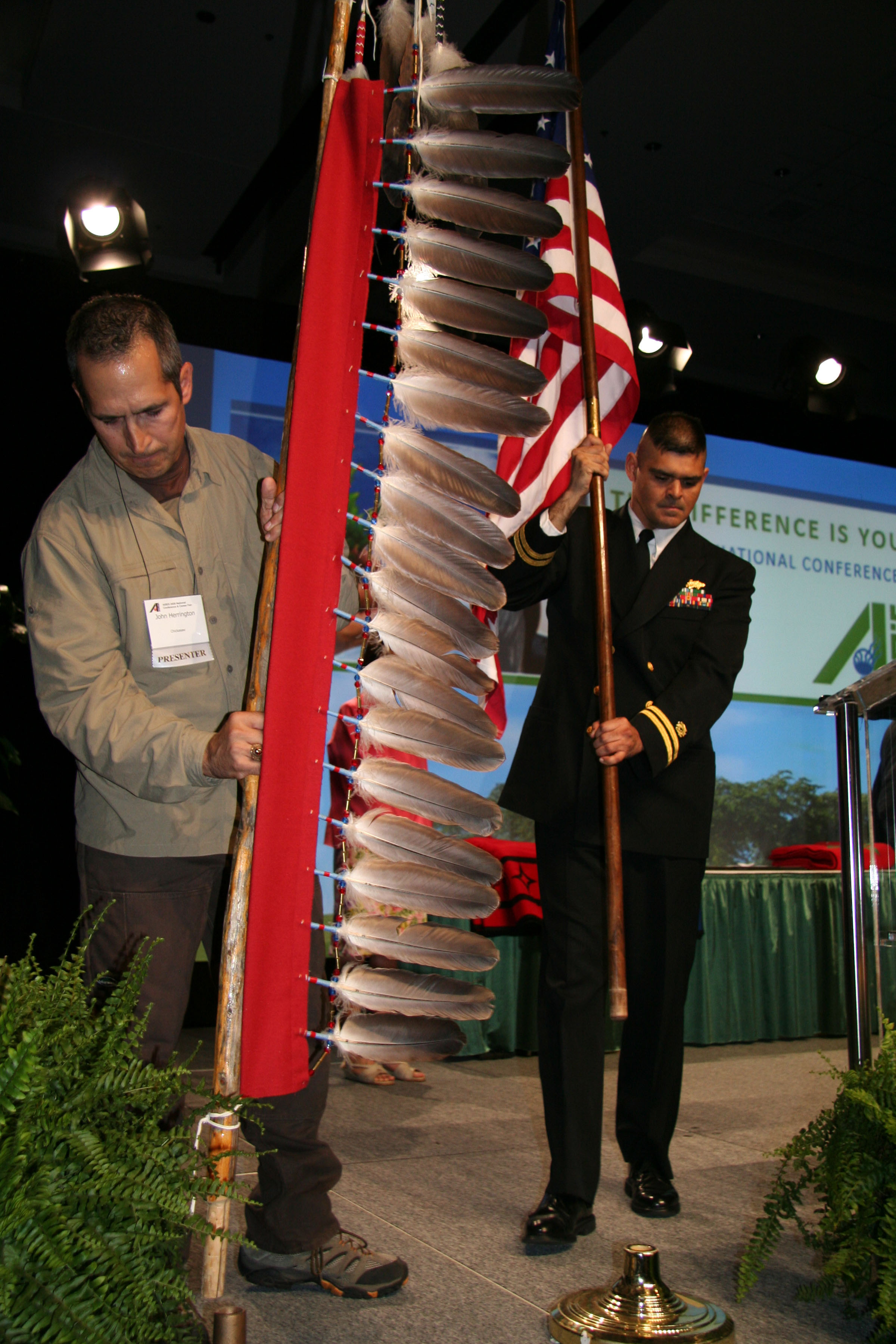
Chickasaw Nation member John Herrington, along with Choctaw Nation of Oklahoma member Lt. Ken Vargas, presents the Eagle Staff.

In the United States, the Eagle feather law provides exceptions to federal wildlife laws regarding eagles and other migratory birds to enable Native Americans to continue their traditional, spiritual and cultural practices.

Under the current 50 CFR 22 of the eagle feather law, individuals of certifiable Native American ancestry enrolled in a federally recognized tribe are legally authorized to obtain eagle feathers. A violation of the Act can result in a fine of $100,000 ($200,000 for organizations), imprisonment for one year, or both, for a first offense. Penalties increase substantially for additional offenses, and a second violation of this Act is a felony.

== Criteria of ownership ==
The eagle feather law has given rise to continuing debate about the criteria for ownership and possession of eagles and eagle parts. Debates have centered on the differences between enrollment in a federally recognized Native American tribe, vs a racial, ethnic or self-identified concept of Indigeneity. Some arguments have centered on non-Natives being opposed to Natives having access to anything that other Americans cannot have.

Defenders of the law have argued it is the only legal protection of Native American spirituality and that because eagle supplies are limited, increasing the number of people who can have eagle parts may make feathers more scarce as well as endanger the lives of too many migratory birds (including threatened or endangered species).

Arguments in favor of amending the law (notably by supporters of Religious Freedom with Raptors, an organization dedicated to changing the eagle feather law) have been made on the grounds that it imposes "racial preferences" for Native Americans and that the requirement of tribal enrollment to possess eagles undermines tribal sovereignty rights to fully welcome and include non-Natives in tribal customs involving eagle feathers. It is also argued that eagle permit certification restrictions based on enrollment status impede people with Indian ancestry but who may be unable to prove their ancestry, from exploring their heritage.

Religious Freedom with Raptors also advocate removing enrollment requirements from 50 CFR 22, stating that enrollment requirements are a racial bias, and that such action would enable all U.S. citizens to apply for eagles or parts from the National Eagle Repository (overseen by the United States Fish and Wildlife Service). The organization claims that this change would extend the ability of government-regulated programs and agencies to protect raptors by decreasing the profitability of raptor poaching and trafficking.

== See also ==
- Native American Rights Fund
- Migratory Bird Treaty Act of 1918
- Eagle-bone whistle
