= Flute circle =

Organization of musicians

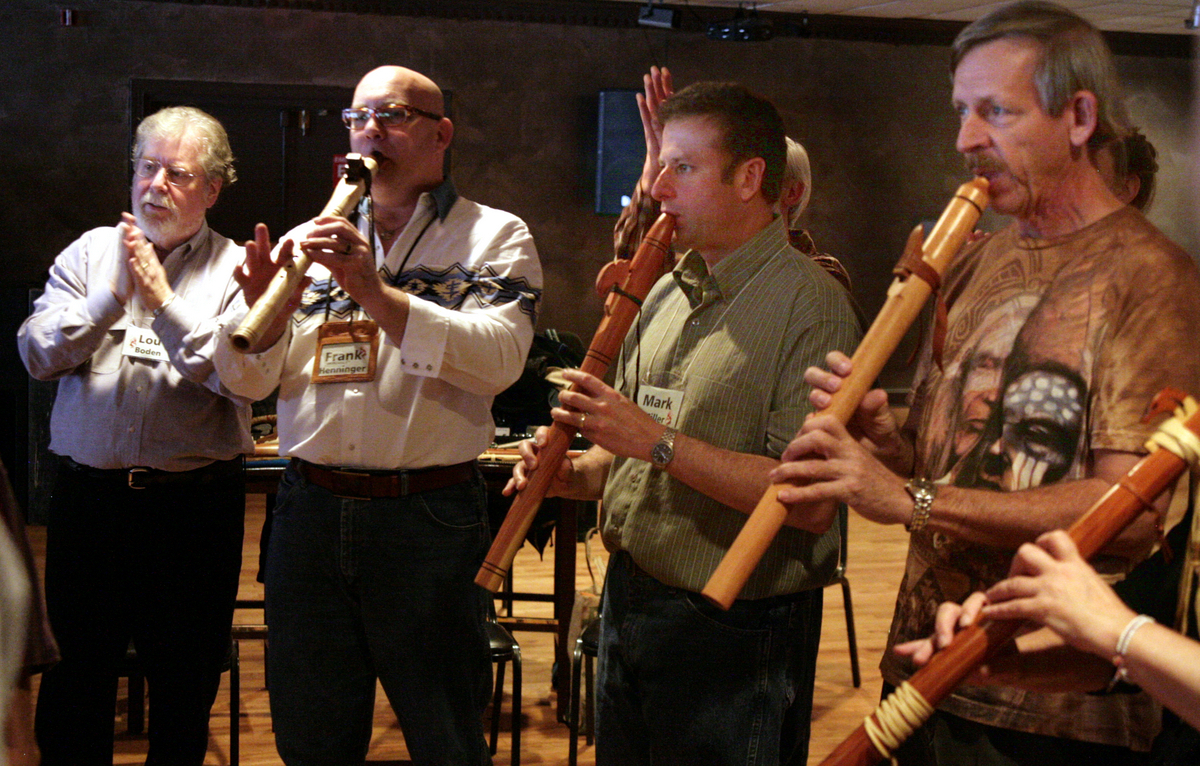
Participants playing Native American flutes at a flute circle

A flute circle is an organization of musicians which focuses on the Native American flute. Flute circles typically meet periodically to engage in educational and recreational activities surrounding the instrument. Most flute circles offer instruction on the Native American flute, especially for flutists who are new to the instrument. Many flute circles have a facilitator with experience in group music facilitation and humanistic music education to structure the activities and the music-making.

This use of the Native American flute in community music is notably different from traditional uses of the instrument for courtship, hunting, or ceremony. This new use of the instrument has not been without controversy, and flute circles are generally advised to use the instrument in a respectful manner because of these considerations.

Flute circle participants may span a wide range of experience and training in music — from professionals to novice flutists or enthusiasts of the Native American flute. Many flute circles focus on raising the level of musicality of the participants across a range of levels of musical experience using basic song forms, music improvisation, and techniques of experiential music education. These techniques include duet and ensemble improvisation forms that include drones, ostinato patterns, and call and response forms. Facilitation forms include traveling ensembles, showcasing, segmenting, and general conducted improvisations — techniques that are shared with other community music structures such as drum circles.

While some flute circles focus on aspects of indigenous cultures and indigenous peoples of the Americas, they do not typically relate to a single culture or tribe.

Flute circles can also organize events for participants to play at events, festivals, school presentations, or in service settings such as senior centers, elder facilities, and group homes. Flute circles have also engaged in their own concerts, produced music albums, and broadcast live music performances.

== Community music ==
Flute circles are one type of community music gathering. Other types include drum circles, community choirs, facilitated dance, and community orchestras. However, Mary Jane Jones argues in her thesis that flute circles have particular attributes not found in other types of community music gatherings:

If the goal of flute players is to express themselves through a Native American-based musical means, it could be argued that they should be able to do that just as effectively through drumming or dancing. The answer may lie with the fact that, as a wind instrument, the flute uses not just the hands, but also the breath. Singing is the ultimate form of personal musical expression. The sound is formed from within the body and the words from within the mind. For people who feel that their voices are inadequate or are hindered from singing traditional Native songs because of their inability to speak their ancestral language, using the breath to produce sound through a simple cylinder may serve as a satisfying substitute. The flute can give them a voice.

== Organizations ==
Several national organizations have formed to provide support to local flute circles:

- WFS — World Flute Society (U.S.A.)
- FTF — FluteTree Foundation (U.S.A.) (formerly RNAFF, Renaissance of the North American Flute Foundation)
- JIFCA — Japan Indian Flute Circle Association (日本インディアンフルートサークル協会) (Japan)

A roster of registered flute circles is maintained by WFS and FTF.

=== Statistics ===
As of March 13, 2016, the roster of flute circles in this article listed 189 organizations in 9 countries, including flute circles in 44 States of the United States and 5 Provinces of Canada.

==== Historical ====
The chart below depicts the historical number of flute circles registered with the WFS (shown in darker blue) and its predecessor organization, the International Native American Flute Association ("INAFA") (shown in lighter blue).

The data for years prior to 2016 were gathered on March 13, 2016 from historical WFS and INAFA web pages provided by the Wayback Machine. The data for 2016 and 2017 were gathered from the live WFS web site on March 4, 2016 and January 3, 2017, respectively.

The data point for each year was taken on the first date in the year that the respective web site was updated. Data for the years 2012–2014 represents the shift in organizations from INAFA to WFS. The data roughly agrees with the Jones thesis, which reported 115 flute circles on the INAFA roster in 2010.

However, rosters of flute circles maintained by WFS and INAFA only represent flute circles that are registered with those organizations; it is not known how many flute circles exist worldwide.

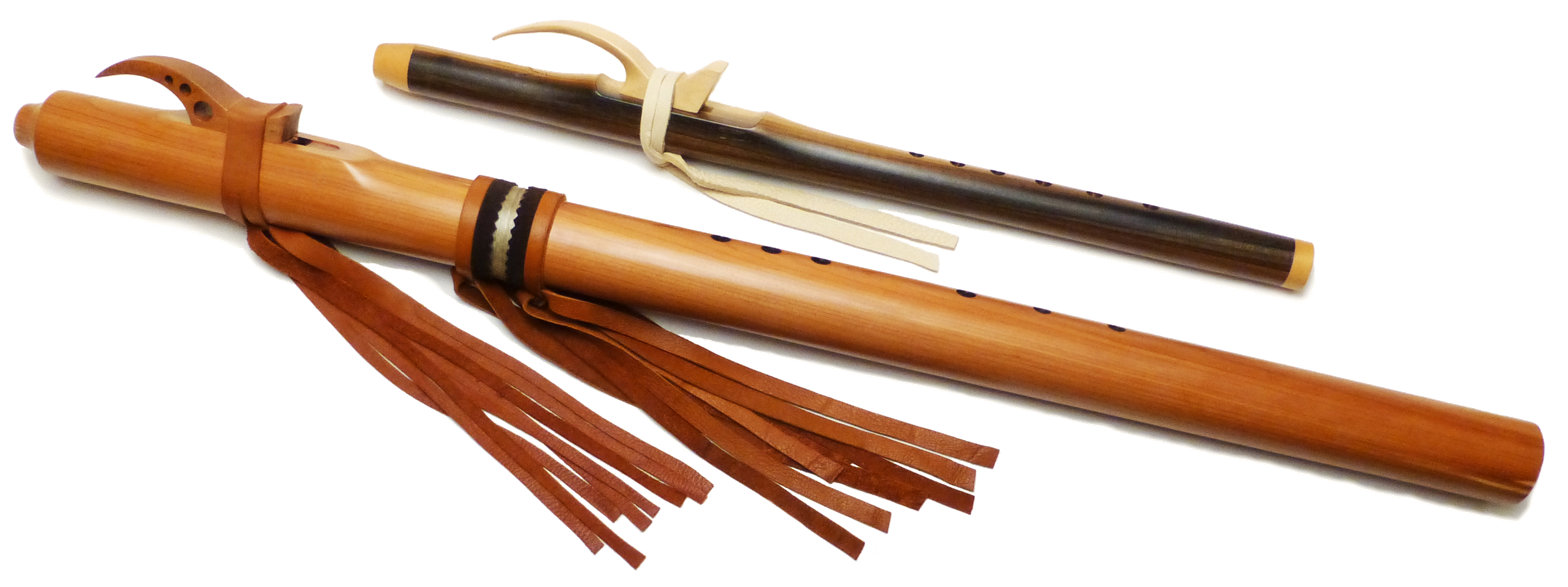
Two contemporary Native American flutes

== List of flute circles ==
This list of flute circles, sorted alphabetically by location (country, then state or province). Only the name and location are provided in this list, along with a link. The link may be (in order of preference) to a Wikilink, a web address, a link to social media, or reference(s) to one or more web sites that maintain rosters of information about specific flute circles.

Please note that inclusion in this list does not represent any endorsement or certification of the organization that is listed. You may click through the link or visit the referenced roster(s) to see details for that organization:

=== Australia ===
- Flute Dreaming Circle (Margate, Byron Bay, Mullumbimby, and Bribie Island)
- Earthsong Flute Circle (ACT — Kambah)

=== Canada ===
==== Alberta ====
- Northern Alberta Native American Flute Circle (Grande Prairie)
- Kiwidinok Flute Circle (Edmonton)

==== British Columbia ====
- Nanaimo Flute Circle (Nanaimo)
- Vancouver Island Flute Circle (Vancouver)

==== Ontario ====
- Native American Flute Association of Ontario (NAFAO)
- Kempenfelt Bay Flute Circle & Muskoka Woodland Echoes Flute Circle (Barrie)
- Loon Echoes Flute Circle (North Bay)
- Northern Woods Flute Circle (Uxbridge)
- Muskoka Woodland Echoes Flute Circle (Bracebridge)

==== Québec ====
- Québec City Flute Circle (Québec City)

==== Saskatoon ====
- Saskatoon Flute Circle (Saskatoon)

=== Colombia ===
- Flautas de Amor Flute Circle (Montenegro)

=== Japan ===
- Japan Indian Flute Circle Association (日本インディアンフルートサークル協会) (across Japan)
- Tokyo Flute Circle (フルートサークル in 東京)
- Happy Beat (Nagoya — Aichi)

=== The Netherlands and Belgium ===
- Dutch and Belgium Native American Flute Circle (Bergen op Zoom) - Last edited on 09-08-2009

=== New Zealand ===
- Auckland Flute Circle (Auckland)
- Flute Swaray (Kapiti)
- Kapiti Flute Circle (Kapiti)
- Palmerston North Flute Circle (Palmerston North)
- Wellington Flute Circle (Wellington)

=== Peru ===
- Andean Native American Flute Circle (Cusco)

=== United Kingdom ===
- Walkingthunder Native American Flute Circle (West Midlands — Coventry)
- North Kent Native American Flute Circle (Welling — Kent)

=== United States ===
==== Alaska ====
- Alaska Flute Circle (Anchorage)

==== Arizona ====
- Westside Flute Circle (Tucson)
- Voyager Flute Circle (Tucson)
- Tucson Flute Circle (Tucson)
- Payson Flute Circle (Payson)
- CherryCows Flute Circle (Tucson)
- Quartzsite Flute Circle (Quartzsite)
- Green Valley Flute Circle (Green Valley)
- Central Arizona Flute Circle (Cottonwood)
- Tucson Five Star Flute and Drum Circle (Tucson)
- Yuma County Flute Circle (Yuma)
- Arizona Flute Circle (Phoenix)
- Tucson Presidio Flute Circle (Tucson)
- Tucson Kokopelli Native American Flute Circle (Tucson)
- Raa-ca-coons (Apache Junction)
- Montezuma Castle Flute Circle (Camp Verde)
- Yavapai Flute Circle (Prescott)
- Forest Sounds Flute Circle (Sun City)
- Desert Whispers Flute Circle of Tucson (Tucson)

==== Arkansas ====
- Bentonville Native American Flute Circle (Bentonville)
- Healing Hearts Flute and Drum Circle (Van Buren)

==== California ====
- Central Coast Flute Circle (Santa Barbara and San Luis Obispo)
- Los Angeles World Flute Circle (Los Angeles)
- San Luis Rey Native American Indian Flute Circle (Oceanside)
- Ancient Winds Flute Circle (Orange County)
- Inland Empire Flute Circle (Cherry Valley)
- San Diego County Flute Circle (Potrero)
- West Los Angeles Flute Circle (Los Angeles)
- Pax Lobos (Gentle Wolves) Flute Circle (Auburn)
- Orange County Wooden Flute Circle (Anaheim)
- Mountainside Flute Circle (Cameron Park)
- Southern California Flute Circle (Modjeska Canyon)
- Yosemite Flute Circle (Oakhurst)
- Coachella Valley Flute Circle (Palm Desert)
- East Bay Flute Circle (SF Bay Area / Union City)
- Northern California Flute Circles
  - Bay Clan — San Francisco / Oakland / San Jose areas
  - Joaquin Clan — Modesto / Fresno areas
  - Loping Wolf — Sacramento area
  - NoNahme Clan — Garden Valley area
  - Valley Clan — Napa and Sonoma counties

==== Colorado ====
- Pike Peak Flute Circle (Colorado Springs)
- Purple Mountain World Flute Circle (Evergreen)
- Southwestern Colorado Flute Circle (Durango)
- Native American Flute Players of Colorado (Colorado Springs)
- Grand Valley Flute Circle (Grand Junction)
- Northern Colorado Flute Circle (Fort Collins)
- Mile High Flute Circle (Denver)
- Rocky Mountain Flute Circle (Kittredge)

==== Connecticut ====
- Connecticut Native American Flute Circle (West Hartford)

==== Delaware ====
- Whispering Woods Native American Flute Circle (Wilmington)

==== Florida ====
- Indian River Flute Circle (Cocoa)
- Central Florida Flute Circle (Plant City)
- Gainesville Flute Circle (Gainesville)
- Native Son Flute Circle (Hudson)
- Riverwind Flute Circle (Leesburg)
- Southlake Flute Circle (Clermont)
- The Journey Flute Group (Bonita Springs)
- Woodland Echoes Flute Circle (Gainesville)
- Cotee River Flute Circle (New Port Richey)
- Emerald Coast Flute Circle (Pensacola)
- Sunshine Music Circles (St Petersburg, FL)

==== Georgia ====
- Georgia Heron House Flute Circle / Healing Waters (Atlanta)

Georgia Flute Circle of Atlanta

==== Idaho ====
- Boise Flute Circle (Boise)

==== Illinois ====
- Henry Presbyterian Church Flute Circle
- Senachwine Flute Circle (Henry / Putnam)
- River Spirit Flute Circle (Peoria)
- Rainbow Warrior Society Native American Flute Circle (Rockford)
- Healing Winds Flute Circle (Hinsdale)
- Healing Earth Native American Flute Circle (Hawthorn Woods)
- River Song Flute Circle (Evergreen Park)
- Living Water Native American Flute Circle (Downers Grove)
- River City Flute Circle (Chillicothe)
- Sangamon Valley Flute Circle (Springfield / Chatham)
- Spirits on the Wind Flute Circle (Bolingbrook)
- Woodland Spirit Flute Circle (Crystal Lake)
- River Spirit Flute Circle (Sparland)
- Chicago Native Flute Circle (Wilmette)

==== Indiana ====
- Indiana Flute Circle

Indiana Flute Circle (Indianapolis)

==== Iowa ====
- Fairfield Flute Circle (Fairfield)
- Two Rivers Flute Circle (West Des Moines)
- Rolling Hills Flute Circle (Centerville)
- Cedar Valley Flute Society (Marion)

==== Kansas ====
- Prairie Wind Flute Circle (Topeka)

==== Louisiana ====
- Louisiana Native American Flute Circle (Baton Rouge)
- Red River Flute Circle (Shreveport)
- Cedar Branch Bayou Flute and Drum Circle (Holden)

==== Maine ====
- Spirit Raven Flute Circle (East Boothbay)

==== Maryland ====
- Maryland Flute Circle (Timonium)
- Chesapeake Shore Flute Circle (Stevensville)
- Windsongs Native American Flute Circle (Havre de Grace / Bel Aire)

==== Massachusetts ====
- Woodland Flute Circle
- Friends of the Native American Flute Circle (East Longmeadow)
- Flutes of Noepe Circle (Vineyard Haven)

==== Michigan ====
- Chippewa Valley Flute Circle (Sanford)
- Paint Creek Flute Circle (Rochester Hills)
- Gitchee Gumee Flute Circle (Marquette)
- Mitigwake Giiwitaashkaa ("Forest Circle") (Midland)
- MagicWind Flute Circle (Clinton)

==== Minnesota ====
- Ten Thousand Lakes Flute Circle (St. Paul)
- Bemidji Area Native American Flute Circle

==== Mississippi ====
- Hattiesburg Native American Flute Circle (Hattiesburg)

==== Missouri ====
- Native American Flute Circle of St. Louis (St. Louis)
- Ozarks Heartland Flute Circle (Springfield)
- SpiritTalkers Native American Flute Circle (Kansas City Area)
- Native Spirit Winds Flute Circle (St. Louis)
- Joplin Native American Flute Circle (Joplin)

==== Montana ====
- Northern Winds Flute Circle (Bozeman)
- Big Sky Flute Circle (Geraldine)

==== Nebraska ====
- Ni-Shudo Flute Circle (Omaha)

==== Nevada ====
- Desert Cloud Flute Circle (Boulder City)

==== New Hampshire ====
- Ancient Voices Musical Community (Manchester)
- Prana Flute Circle (Manchester)

==== New Jersey ====
- Skylands Native American Flute Circle (Hackettstown)
- Open Flute Circle and Music Improvisation (Jersey City)
- Whispering Winds Flute Circle (Monmouth Junction)

==== New Mexico ====
- Wind Spirit Native American Flute Circle (Albuquerque)
- Songs of the Mountain Flute Circle (Sandia Park)
- Desert Winds Flute Circle (Eunice)
- Mesilla Valley Flute Circle (Las Cruces)

==== New York ====
- Songcatcher Flute Circle (Florida, Mid/Lower Hudson Valley)
- Great Spirit Native American Flute Circle (New York City)
- Finger Lakes Flute Circle (Rochester)
- Tall Pine Flute Circle (Delanson)
- Silver Lakes Flute Circle (Staten Island)
- Hudson Valley Flute Circle (Staatsburg)
- Sunset Serenade Native American Flute and Acoustic Rhythms Group (Stuyvesant)
- Folkwinds Flute Circle (Fair Haven)

==== North Carolina ====
- Asheville Flute Circle (Asheville)
- Neuse River Flute Circle (Roxboro / Raleigh)
- Piedmont Flute Circle (Chatham, Orange, and Durham counties)
- Bear Tracks Flute Circle (Hendersonville)
- Kokopelli Native American Flute Circle (Highpoint)

==== Ohio ====
- Cincinnati Native American Flute Circle (Cincinnati)
- Central Ohio Native American Flute Circle (Grove City)
- Massie Creek Flute Circle (Cedarville)
- Miami Valley Flute Circle (Dayton)

==== Oklahoma ====
- Oklahoma Native American Flute Circle (Norman)

==== Omaha ====
- Ni-Shudo (Smoky Water) Flute Circle (Omaha)

==== Oregon ====
- Ashland Flute Circle (Ashland)
- Cascadia Flute Circle (Portland)
- http://www.columbiariverflutecircle.org (Hillsboro, Banks, Manning)
- Pacific Northwest Flute Circle
- Coos Bay Flute Circle (Coos Bay)
- Mid Valley Flute Circle (Corvallis)
- Oregon Flute Circle (Eugene)
- Bear In-Stinx Flute Circle (Grant's Pass)

==== Pennsylvania ====
- The Pennsylvania Native American Flute Circle (Harrisburg / Hershey)
- Warriors of the Light Flute and Drum Circle (Templeton)
- Susquehanna Native American Flute and Drum Circle (Gettysburg)
- Wind Dancers Native American Flute and Drum Circle (Nanty Glo)
- Turtle Moon Native American Flute Circle (Reading-Berks, Pennsylvania)

==== Rhode Island ====
- Rhode Island Flute Circle (Cranston)

==== South Carolina ====
- Cherokee Foothills Flute Circle (Greenville and Spartanburg counties)
- Low Country Flute Circle (Yemassee)
- Carolinas Flute Circle

==== Tennessee ====
- Smoky Mountain Flute Circle (Knoxville / Townsend)
- Flute Circle of Lebanon (Lebanon)
- Cherokee Winds Flute and Drum Circle (Winchester)
- Texoma Native American Flute Circle (Burkburnett)

==== Texas ====
- Lone Star Flute Circle (Austin)
- Heart of the Cedar Flute Circle (Richardson)
- Spring Cypress Native American Flute Circle (Spring)
- Greater Houston Flute Circle (Houston)
- Fort Worth Flute Circle (Fort Worth)

==== Utah ====
- Park City Flute Circle (Park City area)
- Utah Flute Circle 9812 Spruce Grove South Jordan ut
- Zion Flute Circle (St. George)

==== Virginia ====
- Native American Church of Virginia Flute Circle (Bluemont)
- Northern Virginia Flute Circle (Vienna)
- Potomac Flute Circle (Springfield)
- Winchester Native American Flute Circle (Winchester)
- Spiritheart Flute and Drum Circle of the Shenandoah Valley (Staunton)
- Virginia Piedmont (Culpeper county)

==== Washington ====
- Good Medicine Flute Circle (Everett)
- Cascade Flute Circle (Kirkland)
- One Heart Flute Circle (Bothell)
- Firewheel Flute Circle (Everett)
- Spirit Song Flute Circle (Maple Valley)
- Wind Spirit Flute Circle (Puyallup)
- Saltwater Park Flute Circle (Des Moines)
- Golden Winds Flute Circle (Goldendale)

==== West Virginia ====
- West Virginia Native American Flute Circle (Elkins)

==== Wisconsin ====
- Healing Spirit Flute Circle (Milwaukee)
- Central Wisconsin Flute Circle (Stevens Point)
- Clear Water Flute Circle (Chippewa Falls)
- Downtown Milwaukee Healing Spirit Flute Circle (Oak Creek)
- Madison Four Lakes Flute Circle (Madison)
- Mitakuye Oyasin Flute Circle (Ashippun)
- Kokopelli Flute Circle (Metro Milwaukee)
- Wequiock Falls Flute Circle (Green Bay)
- North East Wisconsin Flute Circle (Baileys Harbor)
- Wokini Flute Circle (Ashippun / Waterloo)
- Spirit Lake Flute Circle (Baraboo)
