= Charles Littleleaf =

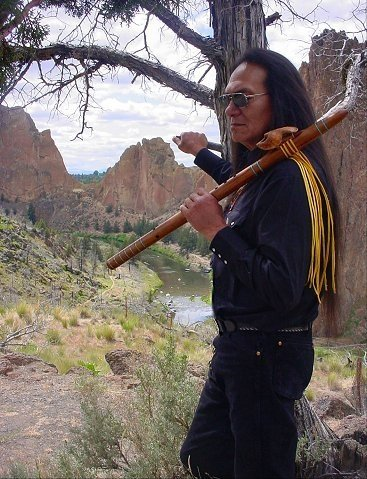
- Charles Littleleaf at Smith Rock State Park, Oregon

Background information
- Born: Confederated Tribes of Warm Springs, Oregon, United States
- Genres: Native American
- Occupations: Musician, flute maker
- Instrument: Native American flute
- Years active: 1995–present
- Label: Littleleaf Music
- Website: https://www.eaglecanyonflutes.com

Charles Littleleaf, a Native American flute player and flute maker, is a tribal citizen of the Warm Springs Indian Reservation, Oregon. Charles is also an honorary member of the Piikani Nation, Alberta, Canada, and is the son of the late Chief Jack Littleleaf of Brocket, Alberta.

== Native American flute player ==
In 1992, Warm Springs tribal member, Charles Littleleaf, received a flute from Native American flutist, R. Carlos Nakai. Nakai's gift was intended to encourage Charles to learn the instrument. The following year, Nakai held one of the first Native American flute workshops at the Feathered Pipe Ranch in Helena, Montana and invited Charles to attend.

The Feather Pipe workshop lasted two weeks and it was here, amidst players much more technically versed in music, where Charles learned Native American flute music.

In search of ways to further express his heart, Charles continued to play the flute without instruction. Through these instruments, he also found an emotional way to release healing qualities that would not only benefit himself but all of mankind. At the beginning of this musical journey, Charles played the flute at the home of his ancestors, primarily to family and friends. This is where the first samples of Charles' music developed.

Later in life, Charles has continued playing the native flute. He grounds his playing within the essence of Mother Earth and draws from memories growing up on his reservation which he shares with audiences around the world.

== Native American flute maker ==
Charles Littleleaf has been creating concert Native American flutes for over 20 years for both professionals and beginners alike.

== Discography ==
- Whispers of Earth Medicine 1997, Littleleaf Music (formerly Redwood Productions)
- Ancient Reflections 2002, Littleleaf Music
- Essence of Life 2019, Littleleaf Music
- Ancient Reflections II 2024, Littleleaf Music

== Collaboration ==
- Heart of the Wolf (flute/vocals with Karen Therese) 2001, Red Feather Music

== Credits ==
- Just Plain Folks Award for 'Song of the Year', Eagle Spirit from artist's Ancient Reflections CD, Los Angeles, CA (2008)
- Featured article in Celebrity Magazine, Cowboys and Indians (Sept. 2007)
- Artist documentary on flute making and biography, Oregon Art Beat, Oregon Public Broadcasting (2004)
- Music soundtrack for the documentary The Oregon Story, Tribal Economies, Oregon Public Broadcasting (2001)
- Native American Music Award (NAMA) Nominee (2001)
