= Larry Snyder =

Larry Snyder or Laurence Snyder may refer to:

- Larry Snyder (hurdler) (1896–1982), track & field athlete and coach
- Laurence H. Snyder (1901–1986), pioneer in human genetics and president of the University of Hawaii
- Larry Snyder (jockey) (1942–2018)
- Given name of Hawk Littlejohn, musician and "medicine man"
