= Vijay Raghav Rao =

- Also known as: Vijaya Raghava Rao
- Born: 3 November 1925; Chennai, India
- Died: 30 November 2011 (aged 86)
- Occupations: Flutist, composer, choreographer, musicologist, poet, writer
- Instrument: Flute

Pandit Vijay Raghav Rao (born Vijaya Raghava Rao; 3 November 1925 – 30 November 2011) was an Indian flutist, composer, choreographer, musicologist, poet and fiction writer.

He was awarded the Padma Shri by Government of India in 1970, and in 1982 the Sangeet Natak Akademi in Creative and Experimental music category, the highest for performing artist conferred by the Sangeet Natak Akademi, India's National Academy for Music, Dance and Drama.

His prominent students include G.S. Sachdev, Ronu Majumdar, and Deepak Ram.

== Personal life ==
He was born in Madras (now Chennai), India. He was married since 1947 to Smt. Lakshmi V. Rao. They had four children, nine grandchildren and one great-grandchild. He was an Indian-American, a permanent resident of the United States.
