= Tom Mauchahty-Ware =

Native American musician from Oklahoma (1949–2015)

Thomas Mauchahty-Ware II
- Born: March 21, 1949
- Died: November 3, 2015 (aged 66)
- Instruments: singing, drum, Native American flute, harmonica, guitar
- Years active: 1970s–2000s
- Formerly of: Blues Nation

Tom Mauchahty-Ware (March 21, 1949 – November 3, 2015) was a Kiowa/Comanche musician. He was a Southern Straight dancer and a member of the Kiowa O-Ho-Mah Lodge society.

== Early life ==
Thomas Ware was born on March 21, 1949, to Wilson Ware (Kiowa) and Pearl Pewo Ware (Kiowa/Comanche) in Oklahoma.

== Career ==
As a musician, he drummed and played the Native American flute, harmonica, and blues guitar. He formed the band Blues Nation in 1990.

He was an accomplished American Indian dancer and regalia maker. He was a skilled visual artist: painting, sculpting, making flutes, bead working, and feather working.

He was a descendant of the famous Kiowa flutist, Belo Cozad, and made commercial recordings, Flute Songs of the Kiowa and Comanche (1978) and The Traditional and Contemporary Indian Flute of Tom Mauchahty Ware (1983), as well as Morning Star (1992) IS50252CD.

== Films ==
- Songkeepers (1999, 48 min.). Directed by Bob Hercules and Bob Jackson. Produced by Dan King. Lake Forest, Illinois: America's Flute Productions. Five distinguished players of Native American flute - Tom Mauchahty-Ware, Sonny Nevaquaya (Comanche), R. Carlos Nakai (Navajo/Ute), Hawk Littlejohn, Kevin Locke (Standing Rock Lakota) – talk about their instrument and their songs and the role of the flute and its music in their tribes.
