= G. S. Sachdev =

Indian musician (1935–2018)

- Born: April 24, 1935; Lyallpur, Punjab Province (British India), India
- Died: June 24, 2018 (aged 83) San Rafael, California, United States of America
- Genres: Hindustani Classical Music
- Instrument: Bansuri (a type of flute)

G. S. Sachdev (born Gurbachan Singh Sachdev, in Lyallpur, Punjab, 24 April 1935 – 24 June 2018) was an Indian performer of the bansuri (bamboo flute). He performed Hindustani classical music.

Sachdev was a student of the flautist Vijay Raghav Rao for 12 years, living with him for 3 years as a disciple.

Sachdev was on the advisory board of the World Flute Society.

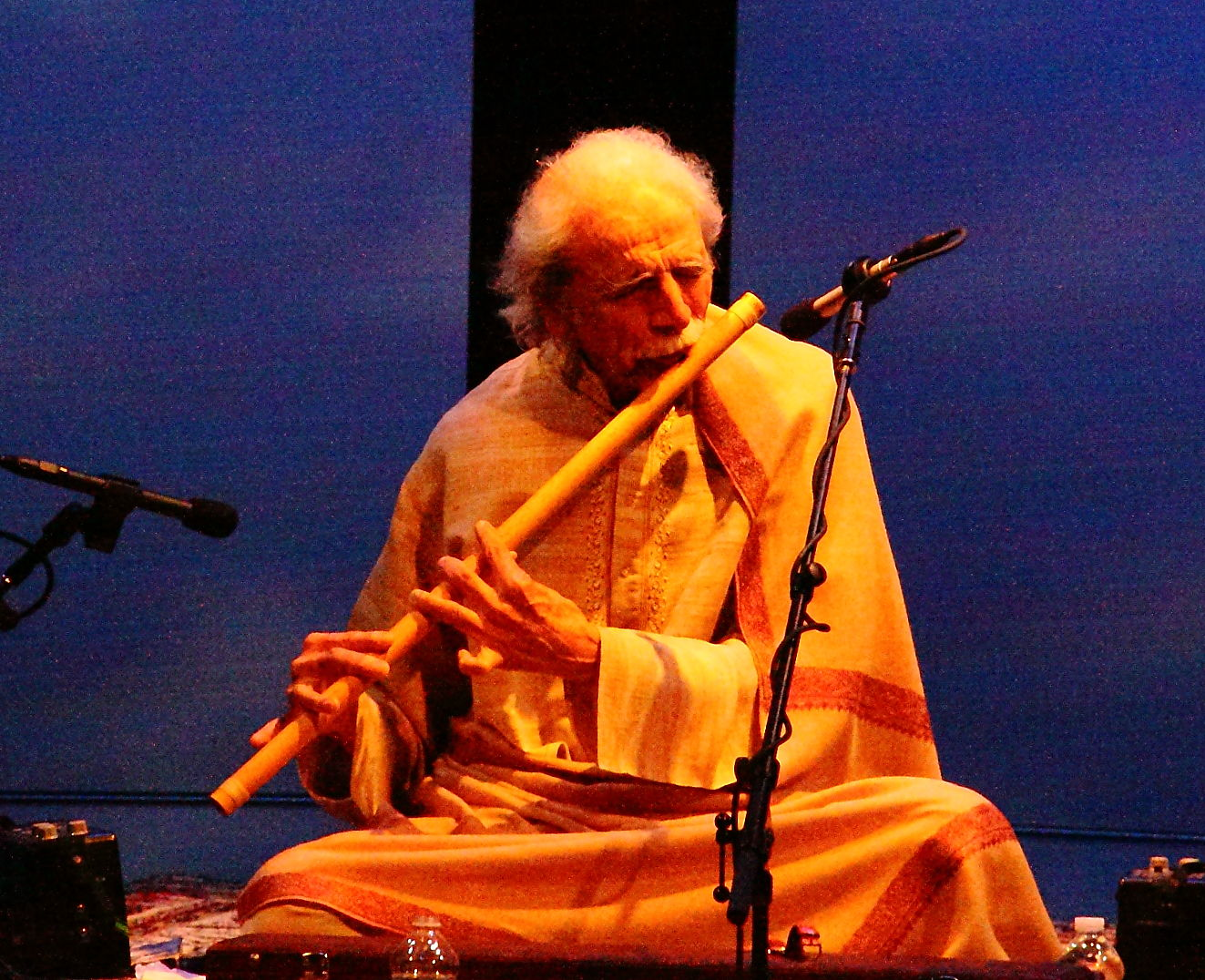
G. S. Sachdev performing at Other Minds in San Francisco in February, 2013.

Among his students were Oscar van Dillen and Jin Hi Kim.

== Discography ==
- Spirit
- Live in Concert
- Flights of Improvisation
- Full Moon
- Master of the Bamboo Flute, v. 2
- Bansuri (Solo)
- Classical North Indian Ragas
- Two Moods
- Romantic Ragas
- Live in New York
- Lyrical Grace
- Amar Sangit
- Jasmine Nights
- Incantations
- Aradhana
- Greeting of the Dawn
- Raga Patdeep (cassette)

== See also ==
- Bansuri
- Hindustani classical music
