= Kevin Locke (musician) =

American musician, storyteller, and educator (1954–2022)

- Tȟokéya Inážiŋ
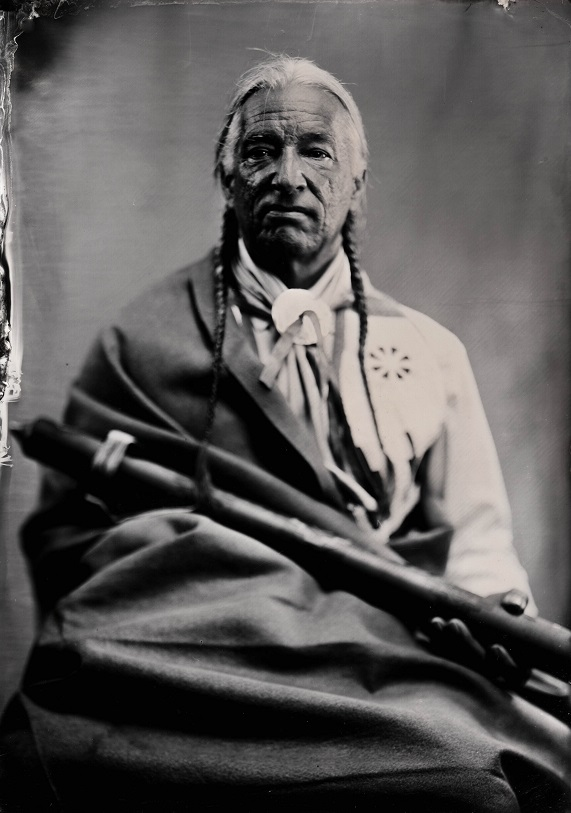
- Locke in 2016, photo entitled First to Awaken
- Born: Tȟokéya Inážiŋ; June 23, 1954; Los Angeles, California, U.S.
- Died: September 30, 2022 (aged 68); Hill City, South Dakota, U.S.
- Occupations: Musician, storyteller, educator

Kevin Edward Locke (Lakota: Tȟokéya Inážiŋ, lit. 'The First to Arise'; June 23, 1954 – September 30, 2022) was of Lakota descent of the Standing Rock Sioux Tribe and Anishinaabe of White Earth. He was a preeminent player of the North American Indigenous Flute, a traditional storyteller, cultural ambassador, recording artist and educator. He was best-known for his hoop dance, The Hoop of Life.

== Biography ==
Born on June 23, 1954, in Los Angeles, CA. At the age of five years Locke moved north with his family, later to settle in South Dakota on the Standing Rock Reservation in 1966. It was from his mother, Patricia Locke, his uncle Abraham End-of-Horn, mentor Joe Rock Boy, and many other elders and relatives that Kevin received training in the values, traditions and language of his native Sioux culture.

Locke came from a distinguished family. His great-great-grandfather was the Dakota patriot, Little Crow. His great-grandmother, Mniyáta Ožáŋžaŋ Wiŋ, was a medicine woman. His maternal grandfather was from the White Earth Indian Reservation. His mother, Patricia Locke, was an activist for Indian rights and recognition. His great-grandfather, Bishop Charles Edward Locke, presided over the funeral of U.S. President William McKinley in Buffalo, New York in 1901. The Bishop had known McKinley from boyhood in Canton, Ohio. Although he was white, he was the president of the local branch of the NAACP and the author of Is the Negro Making Good? or, Have Fifty Years of History Vindicated the Wisdom of Abraham Lincoln in Issuing the Emancipation Proclamation?

Locke attended the Institute of American Indian Arts in New Mexico for high school. He received a bachelor of science degree in Elementary Education from the University of North Dakota and earned a master's degree in educational administration from the University of South Dakota. He taught himself to speak Lakota, his ancestral language, as a young adult. Locke learned the hoop dance, which had nearly died out, from Arlo Good Bear, a Mandan Hidatsa Indian from North Dakota.

Locke, like his mother before him, was widely-known for his work in Lakota language and cultural preservation. In the late 1970s he became an adherent of the Baha’i faith, which emphasizes equality and the unity of all people, concepts that fit well with the Native American hoop dances he had begun to perform. Soon he gave up his career as an educator in favor of educating through performance.

When asked in 2012 about his mission in life, Locke said: "All of the people have the same impulses, spirits, and goals. Through my music and dance, I want to create a positive awareness of oneness of humanity." Locke died on September 30, 2022, at the age of 68, after an asthma attack.

== Career ==
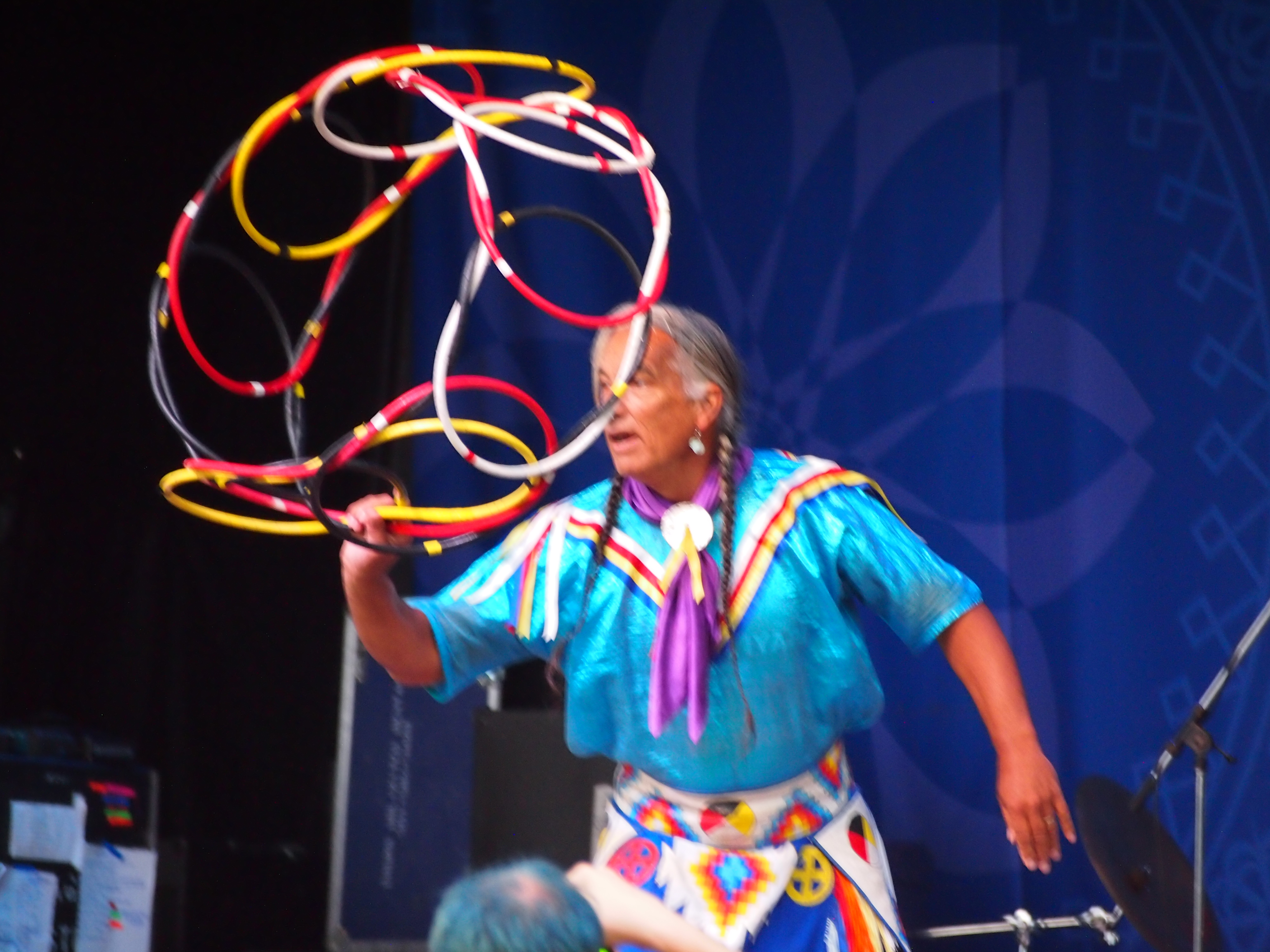
Locke performing a Hoop Dance at the 2016 Ralph Rinzler Memorial Concert, Smithsonian Folklife festival

Locke learned the hoop dance, which had nearly died out, from Arlo Good Bear, a Mandan Hidatsa Indian from North Dakota. From 1978, he traveled to more than 90 countries to perform and continued to perform, such as in September 2014 and most recently in March 2016. His performances usually consisted of flute playing, singing Lakota songs (some in English), and demonstrations of the Sioux hoop dance, using 28 wooden hoops. Of his presentations, Locke has said "I see myself strictly as a preservationist.... I base my repertoire on the old songs. I try to show younger people what was there, and maybe some of the younger people will pick up from there and compose new music." His international performances of recent included Malaysia Rainforest Festival (2018), 9th International Sefika Kutluer Festival: East Meets West in Ankara Turkey (2018), Arte Dule Indigenous Festival in Panama City, Panama (2019) and public concerts in Winterthur and Nonam Museum in Zurich, Switzerland (2020).

In 1990, he received a National Heritage Fellowship from the National Endowment for the Arts, the highest award granted to such traditional artists. In 2009 he won the Bush Foundation Enduring Vision Award. In 2020 he received the news of being awarded the United States Artist Fellowship.

In April 2006 he performed with Joanne Shenandoah in the photography exhibition "Sacred Legacy: Edward S. Curtis and the North American Indian" at Cemal Resit Rey Concert Hall and MEB Sura Concert Hall in Istanbul.

Locke was frequently cited as an ambassador of Native American culture to the United States and the world. He was also active on the board of directors of the Lakota Language Consortium, a non-profit organization working towards the Lakota language revitalization. He was also on the advisory board of the World Flute Society and the Founding President and Creative Director of the Patricia Locke Foundation.

== Awards and honors ==
- 1988 Bush Foundation Fellowship
- 1990 National Heritage Fellowship
- 1999 Native American Music Awards, Best Traditional Recording (The First Flute)
- 2009 Native American Music Awards, Album of the Year (Earth Gift)
- 2009 Independent Music Awards Vox Pop World Traditional Album Winner for First Lightning
- 2009 Bush Foundation Enduring Vision Award
- 2013 Living Indian Treasure awarded by the Governor of South Dakota
- 2013 National Storytelling Network Circle of Excellence Award
- 2017, 2018 Mid Atlantic Arts Foundation USArtist International Awardee
- 2019 First Peoples Fund Cultural Capital Fellow
- 2019 South Dakota Arts Council, Artist Fellowship
- 2020 United States Artists Fellowship
- 2020 International Academy for Human Sciences and Culture Peace Prize
- 2021 First Peoples Fund Cultural Capital Fellow

== Recordings ==
From 1982, Locke recorded 13 albums of music and stories, including:

- Dream Catcher as Tokeya Inajin (July 13, 1993)
- Keepers of the Dream ( June 27, 1995)
- Love Songs of the Lakota (September 29, 1995)
- The Flood and Other Lakota Stories (The Parabola Storytime Series) Harper Audio (March 1996)
- The Flash in the Mirror (April 2, 1996)
- Open Circle (Oct 15, 1996)
- The First Flute (July 27, 1999) — won the Native American Music Award for Best Traditional Recording.
- Midnight Strong Heart (January 1, 2003)
- Lightning and Wind (September 7, 2015)

=== Publications ===
- Arising, Wilmette, IL : Baha'i Publishing, 2018
- Lakota Hoop Dancer, with Suzanne Haldane and Jacqueline Left Hand Bull, Dutton Juvenile; 1st edition (May 1, 1999).
- Real Dakota! : About Dakota by Dakotans! : The life, people & history of the Dakotas by the people who know and love it! by Kevin Locke, Tempe, AZ : Blue Bird Pub., 1988.

=== Films ===
- Songkeepers (1999, 48 min.). Directed by Bob Hercules and Bob Jackson. Produced by Dan King. Lake Forest, Illinois: America's Flute Productions. Five distinguished traditional flute artists - Tom Mauchahty-Ware, Sonny Nevaquaya, R. Carlos Nakai, Hawk Littlejohn, Kevin Locke – talk about their instrument and their songs and the role of the flute and its music in their tribes.

== See also ==
- Baháʼí Faith and Native Americans
- Nipo T. Strongheart, another Native cultural performance artist and Baháʼí.
