= Doc Tate Nevaquaya =

Comanche flute player and painter (1932–1996)

- Born: Joyce Lee Nevaquaya; July 3, 1932; Apache, Oklahoma, U.S.
- Died: March 5, 1996 (aged 63); Lawton, Oklahoma, U.S.
- Citizenship: Comanche Nation and American
- Known for: Flatstyle painting, reviving Southern Plains courting flute
- Spouse: Charlotte
- Children: Sonny, Jereaux, Sue, Edmond, Joycetta, Timothy, Sonia, Joseph, and Calvert
- Parents: Lean Nevaquaya (father); Victoria Weryackwe Nevaquaya (mother)
- Awards: NEA National Heritage Fellow; 1986

Joyce Lee "Doc" Tate Nevaquaya (July 3, 1932 – March 5, 1996) was a Comanche flute player and painter from Apache, Oklahoma. He is known for his contribution to the Native American flute music. His efforts in learning how to make Comanche flutes and play as well as compose contemporary Comanche flute music is considered to have saved the declining art from being lost completely. However, he said he considered himself a painter first, and painting was his primary art throughout his life.

== Early life ==
Joyce Lee Nevaquaya was born in 1932 in Apache, Oklahoma, to two Comanche parents, Victoria and Lean Nevaquaya. His parents died when Nevaquaya was only 13, so he lived with his grandparents, who taught him Comanche ways. and he was raised in the Native American Church and attended meetings frequently.

He was named after Dr. Joyce, the doctor who delivered him, and "Doc" became a nickname because of their relationship. Nevaquaya means "well-dressed" in the Comanche language.

Nevaquaya graduated from Fort Sill Indian School in 1951 and took the Christian name Tate from his grandfather's business partner as a requirement for enrolling in the school. Later, he attended Haskell Institute in Lawrence, Kansas from 1951 to 1952. There he met his future wife, Charlotte, who was a devout Christian. In 1953, they moved back to Apache where they had five sons and four daughters (Sonny, Jereaux, Sue, Edmond, Joycetta, Timothy, Sonia, Joseph and Calvert) who were all raised under Christian values. He worked many jobs throughout his life and pursued his art on the side. Throughout his life, Nevaquaya worked as a teacher, Methodist lay minister, dancer, composer, singer, historian, painter, and Native American flautist. His devotion to his art greatly influenced the artistic pursuits of his children as well, and his sons have all become accomplished flutist, painters, or dancers.

== Art career ==
Although he is well known for his flute playing, Nevaquaya considered himself a painter first. He started painting in the 1950s with encouragement from his wife, Charlotte Nevaquaya, who recognized his talent early on. He had no formal training and is considered a self-taught artist. He painted with watercolor, acrylic, tempera, and prints in the Oklahoma Traditional Style with mostly earth tones. He would begin with a sketch that would then be transferred to the board that would be painted on. He was very knowledgeable of Comanche history and culture, and his primary concern was in conveying the beauty of Comanche culture and identity, as well as that of the other tribes he depicted in his art. It is known that he was familiar with other Comanche artists as well, specifically Leonard Riddles (Black Moon Riddles), Bill Poafpybitty, Rance Hood, and Weckeah Bradley, and would invite them over frequently to discuss their art. He sometimes made cartoons as well and knew how to integrate comedy into his work as well.

== Commissions ==
- Composed and performed Flight of the Spirit at Oklahoma State Capitol by the Oklahoma Arts Council (1991)
- Designed two coins by the Oklahoma Diamond Jubilee (1982)
- Comanche shield to honor the Tomb of the Unknown Soldier in Arlington National Cemetery (1973)
- Buffalo hide painting for the Fort Sill Centennial by the Comanche tribe
- Created and decorated a full-sized Comanche tipi for the Southern Plains Indian Museum

== Public collections ==
- Clarkson University Art Gallery, Potsdam, New York
- Comanche National Museum and Cultural Center, Lawton, Oklahoma
- Gilcrease Museum, Tulsa, Oklahoma
- National Museum of the American Indian, Smithsonian Institution, Suitland, Maryland
- Woolaroc Museum, Bartlesville, Oklahoma

== Music career ==
Nevaquaya was instrumental in reviving and popularizing the Southern Plains courting flute. He first heard flute music when he was seven years old and found his first flute inside a trunk which he purchased from a pawn shop in his early teens. Growing up, Nevaquaya was taught traditional Comanche crafts and developed an interest for the courting flute. As an adult, he learned to make his own flutes and play Comanche flute music. He became a renowned performing artist who could sing, dance, and compose music.

According to the National Endowment for the Arts, "The courting flute is an end-blown instrument generally made of wood and constructed with a movable block through which the musical intonation can be changed." It is a traditional instrument common to many Native American tribes, and for the Comanche it was historically used in solo performances for courting by men. As these traditional courting rituals became less practiced however, the role of the courting flute began to wane and Indigenous musicians like Nevaquaya were essential to revitalizing it and popularizing the instrument again in a modern way for the Comanche people. He called this “a modern courting song style” which allowed a musician to improvise while not breaking from the “aesthetic parameters of Plains Indian musical forms.” Through this technique, he became a renowned performing artist who could sing, dance, and compose music and passed on the art to his sons who are committed to continuing the tradition as well.

Nevaquaya released two musical albums during his lifetime: Indian Flute Songs from Comanche Land (1976) and Comanche Flute Music (1979). He lectured and taught workshops about his flute playing all over the country. He performed on television 25 times including “On the Road with Charles Kuralt” and “Good Morning America.”

He received the 1986 National Heritage Fellowship awarded by the National Endowment for the Arts, which is the United States government's highest honor in the folk and traditional arts. In 2006, he was inducted into the Native American Music Awards Hall of Fame.

== Death ==
Nevaquaya died from a heart attack at the age of 64 on March 5, 1996, at Comanche County Memorial Hospital in Lawton, Oklahoma. His son, Sonny released an album in honor of his father, Doc Tate Nevaquaya - Legend and Legacy. Sonny lived in Florida until his death on February 27, 2019.

== Films ==
- Songkeepers (1999, 48 min.). Directed by Bob Hercules and Bob Jackson. Produced by Dan King. Lake Forest, Illinois: America's Flute Productions. Five distinguished traditional flute artists - Tom Mauchahty-Ware, Sonny Nevaquaya, R. Carlos Nakai, Hawk Littlejohn, Kevin Locke – talk about their instrument and their songs and the role of the flute and its music in their tribes.

=== Performances ===
- The first Native American to perform at Carnegie Hall (1990)
- Codetalkers Decoration Ceremony, Oklahoma State Capitol (1989)
- United Nations Mission, New York (1985)
- "A Night of the First Americans" at the Kennedy Center, in Washington, D.C. (1985)
- Recorded Comanche Flute Music for Folkways Records (1979)
- National Folk Festival (1973)
- The Comanche Tu-Wee Dance at the Smithsonian Institution in Washington, D.C. (1970)
- Goodwill Tour of England (1970)

== Memberships ==
- American Indian Arts Association
- American Indian Cultural Society
- Oklahoma Indian Mission Arts and Crafts Organization
- Southwestern Indian Arts and Crafts, Inc.
- Oklahoma Indian Art League
- University of Oklahoma Board of Visitors (1994)

== Awards and acknowledgments ==
- The Governor's Arts Award named him an Oklahoma Treasure in (1995)
- Selected the Red Earth Honored One (1993)
- Artist of the West Award at the American Indian and Cowboy Artists National Western Art Exhibition in San Dimas, California (1994)
- First Oklahoman to win the National Heritage Fellowship Award at the National Endowment for the Arts (1986)
- The second Friday in October was proclaimed Joyce "Doc" Tate Nevaquaya Day by the Comanche tribe (1986)
- LaDonna Harris Award from Oklahomans for Indian Opportunity (1986)
- Outstanding Citizen of Diamond Jubilee Heritage Week from the Apache Chamber of Commerce (1982)
- Indian of the Year award from Oscar Rose Junior College, Midwest City (1975)
- The "Doc Tate Scholarship Fund" under the University of Oklahoma's Fine Arts Department (1970)
- Outstanding Indian Artists Award from Southwestern State College in Weatherford (1969)
