= Hawk Littlejohn =

American carver of flutes

- Born: Larry Snyder; 1941; Ohio
- Died: December 14, 2000 (aged 58–59); Old Fort, North Carolina, U.S.
- Occupations: Flute maker, medicine man, adjunct professor

Hawk Littlejohn (1941 – December 14, 2000) was an American musician and carver of Native American flutes.

He worked as an adjunct professor in Social and Administrative Medicine from 1982 to 1983 at the University of North Carolina at Chapel Hill

== Background ==
Hawk Littlejohn's given name was Larry Snyder, and he was born in Ohio in 1941. His mother was Garnette A. Snyder (1918–1998) from Milledgeville, Ohio, and his father was Lawrence H. Snyder (died 1993).

In 1972 Littlejohn's official biography said he was born on a reservation in North Carolina. The Qualla Boundary of the Eastern Band of Cherokee Indians is actually a land trust rather than a reservation. A 1975 essay that Littlejohn wrote for the Appalachian Journal states that "Hawk Littlejohn was born in Tahlequah, Oklahoma, and is a member of the Western Band of Cherokees."

The Tennessee Valley Authority requested that the FBI investigate Littlejohn's background. The FBI did not confirm or deny this investigation, but the investigation was widely leaked and fueled many rumors. These included that Hawk Littlejohn was not Native American and was born in Akron, Ohio.

== Activism ==
In 1972, Littlejohn publicly opposed the flooding of historic Cherokee sites by the construction of the Tellico Dam.

== Consultancy and writing ==
The Smithsonian Institution and the North Carolina Museum of History both consulted with him. He published a column "Good Medicine" in the Katuah Journal. He published an essay "The Reawakening of the Cherokees" in the Appalachian Journal in 1975. Littlejohn was a friend and advisor to Barbara Duncan, the education director of the Museum of the Cherokee Indian in Cherokee, North Carolina.

Littlejohn and his student David Winston led sweat lodge ceremonies for the Friends General Conference, a Quaker gathering, that was held in Boone, North Carolina in 1988. George Price, a Quaker who went on to develop the Quaker Sweat ceremony, described Littlejohn as "the last traditionally trained Eastern Cherokee medicine man."

== Personal ==
Littlejohn married a nurse from a Knoxville hospital. Later he married Geri Littlejohn, who apprenticed with him learning to carve flutes.

== Films ==
- Songkeepers (1999, 48 min.). Directed by Bob Hercules and Bob Jackson. Produced by Dan King. Lake Forest, Illinois: America's Flute Productions. Five distinguished traditional flute artists - Tom Mauchahty-Ware, Sonny Nevaquaya, R. Carlos Nakai, Hawk Littlejohn, Kevin Locke – talk about their instrument and their songs and the role of the flute and its music in their tribes.

== Death ==
At the time of his death, Littlejohn was living in Old Fort, North Carolina.

== See also ==
- Cherokee descent
- Plastic shaman
