= R. Carlos Nakai =

American flutist (born 1946)

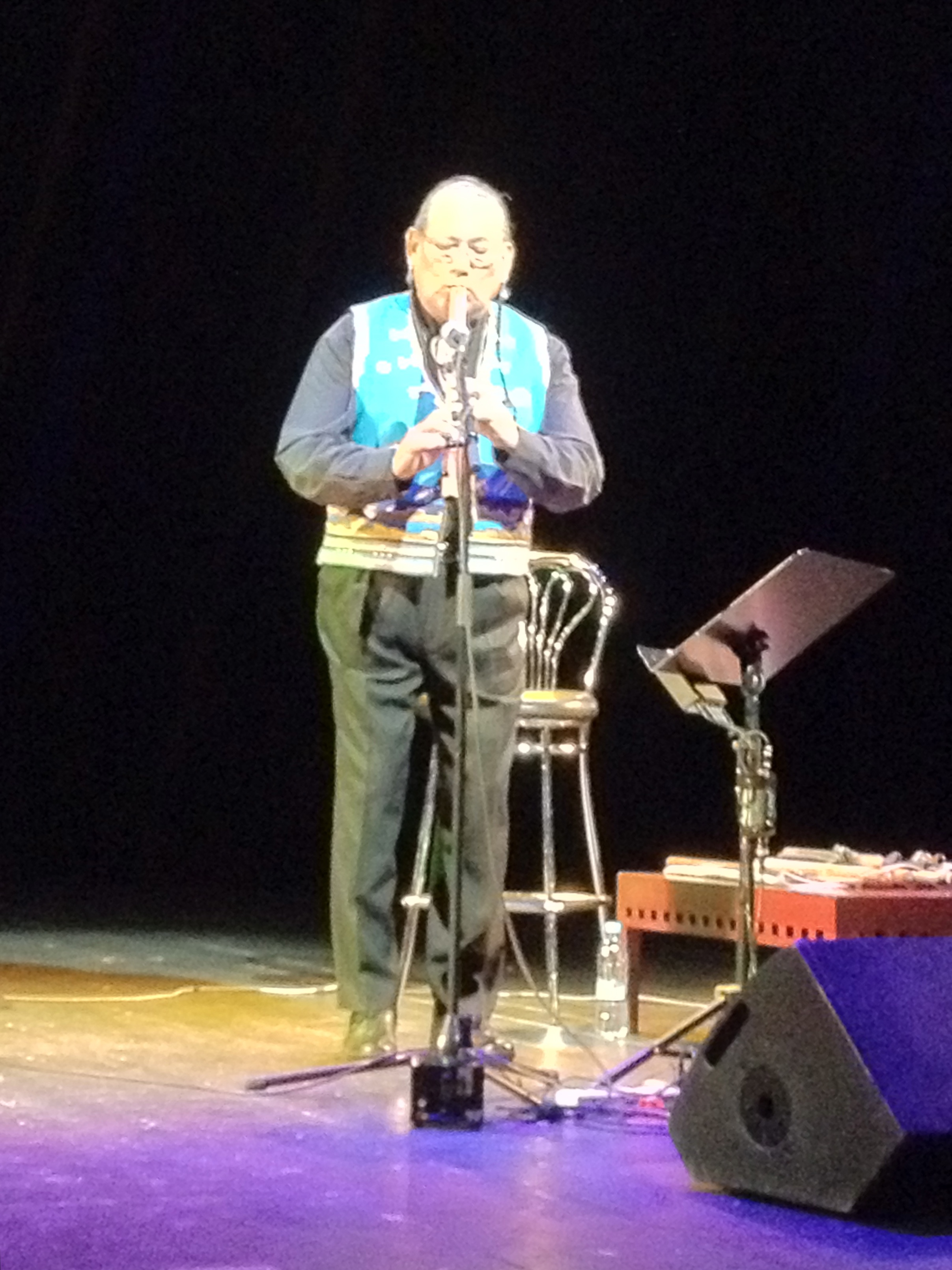
- Nakai playing in Moscow in 2012
- Born: April 16, 1946 (age 80); Flagstaff, Arizona, United States
- Occupation: Native American flute player
- Years active: 1982–present
- Awards: Grammy Award nominations
- Website: www.rcarlosnakai.com

Raymond Carlos Nakai (born April 16, 1946) is an American flutist. Nakai played brass instruments in high school and college, and auditioned for the Armed Forces School of Music after a two-year period in the United States Navy. He began playing a traditional Native American cedar flute after an accident left him unable to play the trumpet. Largely self-taught, he released his first album Changes in 1983, and afterward signed a contract with Canyon Records, which produced more than 30 of his albums in subsequent years. His music features original compositions for the flute inspired by traditional Native American melodies. Nakai has collaborated with musicians William Eaton, Peter Kater, Philip Glass, Nawang Khechog, Paul Horn, and Keola Beamer. He has received 11 Grammy Award nominations for his albums.

== Biography ==
=== Early life and education ===
Raymond Carlos Nakai was born in Flagstaff, Arizona, on April 16, 1946, to a family of Navajo and Ute descent. His father Raymond Nakai served as the Chairman of the Navajo Nation from 1963 to 1970. As a child he would audition tapes for a Navajo language radio show hosted by his parents; in doing so, he heard a recording of William Horn Cloud, a Lakota musician from the Pine Ridge Reservation, playing the flute. When he enrolled in a high school on the Colorado River Indian Reservation in Arizona, he sought to play the flute in the school band, but was assigned the cornet instead, which, he later said, he was less interested in.

He began studying at Northern Arizona University in 1966, where he played brass instruments in the marching band. As a second-year student, he was drafted into the United States Navy, and spent two years studying communications and electronics in Hawai'i and the south Pacific. He auditioned for the Royal Hawaiian Band, but was turned down as he was not Hawaiian himself. He continued to receive musical training while in the military. He returned to the Navajo reservation in 1971, where he had a difficult period; several of his classmates had been killed in the Vietnam War. He passed the highly competitive auditions for the Armed Forces School of Music, and was 28th on the waiting list for admission. Playing with the Armed Forces Band became impossible after an auto accident damaged his mouth, making it impossible to produce the correct embouchure to continue playing brass instruments. Nakai now resides in Tucson, Arizona.

=== Musical career ===
After his accident, Nakai had a brief struggle with drugs and alcohol. In 1972 he was given a traditional cedar flute, which he gradually taught himself to play, going on to purchase an instrument from Oliver William Jones, a flute maker from California who Nakai met while working as a vendor at a museum. Jones would continue to supply Nakai with flutes for several years. Nakai found it difficult to expand his repertoire due to the absence of recordings or scores for traditional flute music; he therefore began to learn vocal music, and adapted many traditional songs for the flute. He returned to Northern Arizona University to earn a Bachelor's Degree in 1979 and later earned a master's degree in American Indian studies from the University of Arizona. He taught graphic art at a high school until 1983; his wife also worked as a teacher at the time.

Nakai began recording his music on cassettes, and selling them on the Navajo Reservation. After a period of little success, he played his music during an exhibition at the Heard Museum, where a representative of Canyon Records bought one of his cassettes. His playing impressed the museum's administrators, who offered him a job; Nakai subsequently worked for the museum for three years. He recorded the album Changes in 1983 and sold it independently; soon afterward, he signed a contract with Canyon Records, which would release more than 30 of his recordings over the next decades. By 2016, Nakai had recorded more than 30 commercial albums with Canyon records and several more with other producers, and had sold more than 3.5 million records. These recordings included several collaborations, including with the Japanese folk ensemble Wind Travelin' Band, the Philadelphia Orchestra's cellist Udi Bar-David, guitarist William Eaton, American composer Philip Glass, Tibetan flutist Nawang Khechog, flutist Paul Horn, and slack key guitar player Keola Beamer.

=== Genre and style ===
Nakai's music prominently features improvisations on the Native American cedar flute. He also plays the eagle-bone whistle, and uses synthesizers, chanting, and sounds from nature. Although he occasionally plays arrangements of traditional melodies, most of his music attempts to "[create] original compositions that capture the essence of his heritage in highly personalized ways." Nakai states: "I build upon the tribal context, while still retaining its essence. Much of what I do builds upon and expresses the environment and experience that I'm having at the moment." His collaborations have included works produced with musicians of different genres, including jazz, western classical music, and traditional music from different parts of the world. Nakai also composed a few "light-hearted" orchestral works. Although his music has been popular among enthusiasts of New Age music, he has disagreed with that categorization.

=== Recognition and legacy ===
Many of Nakai's records have been critically and commercially successful. Two albums, Earth Spirit (1987) and Canyon Trilogy (1989), were certified Gold by the Recording Industry Association of America. Music review website AllMusic called Canyon Trilogy "[elegant] in its simplicity", and referred to Earth Spirit as "an outstanding CD from a soulful man."

Nakai's 1995 collaboration with William Eaton, Feather, Stone, and Light, topped the New Age music album charts for 13 weeks, and was listed as a Billboard Critic's choice. He has been nominated for the Grammy Award eleven times: first in 1993 for Ancestral Voices in the Best Traditional Folk Album category, and later eight times in the Best New Age Album category, and twice in the Best Native American Album category. He has been described as one of the "most prolific and innovative artists" within his genre.

Nakai developed a system of tablature notation, commonly known as Nakai tablature, that could be used to represent Native American music in a notation similar to that of Western classical music. It could be used across different flute types, as notes in it corresponded to intervals from the fundamental frequency of the flute, rather than to an absolute frequency.

Nakai was featured on the 1999 film Songkeepers, which depicted five Native American flute players—Nakai, Tom Mauchahty-Ware, Sonny Nevaquaya, Hawk Littlejohn, Kevin Locke—talking about their instruments and songs, and the role of the flute and its music in their tribes. Nakai's 1985 composition Cycles was used by the Martha Graham Dance Company in 1988 as the music for its ballet Nightchant. In 1993, Nakai played the flute as a soloist for the Phoenix Symphony's world premiere of a concerto for the ceder flute, composed by James DeMars.

In 2005, Nakai was inducted into the Arizona Music & Entertainment Hall of Fame. Nakai was awarded the Arizona Governor's Arts Award in 1992. He received an honorary doctorate from Northern Arizona University in 1994, and the NAUAA Dwight Patterson (1934) Alumnus of the Year Award in 2001. The Library of Congress has more than 30 of his recordings preserved in the American Folklife Center.

== Discography ==
Nakai's first album was released in 1983 by Canyon Records. He has since released 40 other albums on Canyon and appeared as a guest on other labels.

== Publications ==
- Nakai, R. Carlos; DeMars, James; Light, Ken; McAllester, David P. (1996). The Art of the Native American Flute. Canyon Records Productions. ISBN 9780964788602.
