= Migratory Bird Treaty Act of 1918 =

US law protecting migratory birds

- Long title: An Act To give effect to the convention between the United States and Great Britain for the protection of migratory birds concluded at Washington, August sixteenth, nineteen hundred and sixteen, and for other purposes.
- Enacted by: the 65th United States Congress
- Effective: July 3, 1918

Citations
- Statutes at Large: 40 Stat. 755

Legislative history
- Introduced in the Senate as S. 1553 by George P. McLean; Passed the Senate on July 30, 1917; Passed the House on June 6, 1918 (237–34); Signed into law by President Woodrow Wilson on July 3, 1918

The Migratory Bird Treaty Act of 1918 (MBTA), codified at 16 U.S.C. §§ 703–712 (although §709 is omitted), is a United States federal law, first enacted in 1918 to implement the convention for the protection of migratory birds between the United States and Canada. The statute makes it unlawful without a waiver to pursue, hunt, take, capture, kill, or sell nearly 1,100 species of birds listed therein as migratory birds. The statute does not discriminate between live or dead birds and also grants full protection to any bird parts, including feathers, eggs, and nests. A March 2020 update of the list decreased the number of species to 1,093.

Some exceptions to the act, including the eagle feather law, are enacted in federal regulations (50 CFR 22), which regulate the taking, possession, and transportation of bald eagles, golden eagles, and their "parts, nests, and eggs" for "scientific, educational, and depredation control purposes; for the religious purposes of American Indian tribes; and to protect other interests in a particular locality." Enrolled members of federally recognized tribes may apply for an eagle permit for use in "bona fide tribal religious ceremonies."

The United States Fish and Wildlife Service issues permits for otherwise prohibited activities under the act. These include permits for taxidermy, falconry, propagation, scientific and educational use, and depredation, an example of the last being the killing of geese near an airport, where they pose a danger to aircraft.

The Act was enacted in an era when many bird species were threatened by the commercial trade in birds and bird feathers. The Act was one of the first federal environmental laws (the Lacey Act had been enacted in 1900). The Act replaced the earlier Weeks-McLean Act (1913). Since 1918, similar conventions between the United States and four other nations have been made and incorporated into the MBTA: Mexico (1936), Japan (1972) and the Soviet Union (1976, now its successor state Russia). Some of the conventions stipulate protections not only for the birds themselves, but also for habitats and environments necessary for the birds' survival.

Constitutionally this law is of interest as it is a use of the federal treaty-making power to override the provisions of state law. The principle that the federal government may do this was upheld in the case Missouri v. Holland. In a defense of the treaty, Federal Judge Valerie Caproni on August 11, 2020, wrote in a decision, "It is not only a sin to kill a mockingbird, it is also a crime."

After an update to administrative law on January 5, 2021, the United States Department of the Interior ceased to enforce penalties under the Migratory Bird Treaty Act for the accidental killings of birds by businesses or individuals. This change was revoked on October 4, 2021.

== Sections ==
- § 703: Taking, killing, or possessing migratory birds unlawfully
- § 704: Determination as to when and how migratory birds may be taken, killed, or possessed
- § 705: Transportation or importation of migratory birds; when unlawful
- § 706: Arrests; search warrants
- § 707: Violations and penalties; forfeitures
- § 708: State or Territorial laws or regulations
- § 709: Omitted
- §709a: Authorization of appropriations
- § 710: Partial invalidity; short title
- § 711: Breeding and sale for food supply
- § 712: Treaty and convention implementing regulations; seasonal taking of migratory birds for essential needs of indigenous Alaskans to preserve and maintain stocks of the birds; protection and conservation of the birds

== History ==
Louis Marshall had a key influence as an intervenor on a landmark case before the Supreme Court underscoring the right and responsibility of the federal government for environmental protection and conservation. In a friend of the court brief in Missouri v. Holland on behalf of the Association for the Protection of the Adirondacks, Marshall successfully persuaded the court to uphold the Migratory Bird Treaty Act of 1918, between the United States and Canada. As characterized by Adler, Marshall argued, "the United States did have the power to create such legislation; that Congress was well within its rights; and that the Act was constitutional"; and, further, "If Congress possessed plenary powers to legislate for the protection of the public domain, then it had to take into account all possibility for such protection", including protection of migratory birds, "these natural guardians" against "hostile insects, which, if not held in check ... would result in the inevitable destruction" of "both prairie and forest lands". According to Handlin, Marshall's intervention "was a major factor in the decision."

=== Revisions since 2000 ===
In the August 24, 2006, edition of the Federal Register, the U.S. Department of the Interior's Fish and Wildlife Service proposed adding 152 species, removing 12 species, and correcting/updating the common or scientific names of numerous others. Reasons for the proposed revisions include birds mistakenly omitted previously, new evidence on geographic distribution, taxonomic changes, etc. In addition, the mute swan (Cygnus olor), which was afforded temporary protection due to court order since 2001, is formally excluded from protection in the proposal due to "nonnative and human introduced" status. The previous update to the list occurred on 5 April 1985.

On January 9, 2001, the US Supreme Court ruled 5-to-4 to throw out what had been dubbed the "Migratory Bird Rule", in Solid Waste Agency of Northern Cook Cty. v. Army Corps of Engineers – a case that pitted a consortium of towns around Chicago against the US Army Corps of Engineers over isolated wetlands inhabited or visited by over 100 migratory bird species. In this case, Skokie, Illinois, wanted abandoned quarries filled with water, but not connected to another or navigable body of water to serve as a site for a solid waste facility. For the previous 15 years, lower courts had sustained the law in favor of migratory birds, siding with the Army Corps.

At least one state reacted to the new Supreme Court ruling by restoring isolated wetlands protection: 2001 Wisconsin Act 6, is the first of its kind nationwide to restore wetlands regulation to the state after federal authority had been revoked. It restores protection to over one million acres (4,000 km²) of isolated wetlands in Wisconsin. On May 7, 2001, Wisconsin Governor Scott McCallum signed a bill protecting wetlands by placing Wisconsin wetlands regulation under the jurisdiction of the Wisconsin Department of Natural Resources. Bipartisan state legislators fully supported the bill and felt it was necessary after the Supreme Court ruled that the federal clean water act didn't give the corps authority over decisions involving isolated wetlands.

== Impact on private property owners ==
Migratory birds may seek respite within trees or on buildings considered private property. The Migratory Bird Treaty Act of 1918 prohibits the removal of all listed species or their parts (feathers, eggs, nests, etc.) from such property. However, in extreme circumstances, a federal permit might be obtained for the relocation of listed species (in some states a state permit is required in addition to a federal permit). Pursuant to the spirit of the treaty, it is not trivial to obtain a permit; the applicant must meet certain criteria as outlined in Title 50, Code of Federal Regulations, 21.27, Special Purpose Permits.

The permit applicant is generally a contractor who specializes in wildlife relocation. When hiring a contractor to trap and relocate any animal from one's property, the private property owner is well advised to attain proof of such permits before any trapping activity begins, as trapping without the necessary paperwork is common in the United States.

Most wildlife management professionals consider relocation actions undue harm to the birds, particularly since relocated birds (being migratory) often return to the same property the next year. In the case of trapping and relocation, harm is brought on by or can result in:

- Breaking, a term describing increased susceptibility to disease brought on by the stress of capture and relocation
- Difficulty in establishing territory at the new location
- Separation of family members and the stunting of juveniles' natural progression into adulthood

== Game birds and hunted species ==
The migratory bird conventions with Canada and Mexico define "game birds" as those species belonging to the following families:

- Anatidae (swans, geese, and ducks)
- Rallidae (rails, gallinules, and coots)
- Gruidae (cranes)
- Charadriidae (plovers and lapwings)
- Haematopodidae (oystercatchers)
- Recurvirostridae (stilts and avocets)
- Scolopacidae (sandpipers, phalaropes, and allies)
- Columbidae (pigeons and doves)

The Migratory Bird Treaty Act, which implements the conventions, grants the Secretary of the Interior the authority to establish hunting seasons for any of the migratory game bird species listed above. In actuality, the Fish and Wildlife Service has determined that hunting is appropriate only for those species for which there is a long tradition of hunting, and for which hunting is consistent with their population status and their long-term conservation. It is unlikely, for example, that we will ever see legalized hunting of plovers, curlews, or the many other species of shorebirds whose populations were devastated by market gunners in the last decades of the 19th century.

Although the Migratory Bird Treaty Act considers some 170 species to be "game birds," less than 60 species are typically hunted each year. The Fish and Wildlife Service publishes migratory game bird regulations in the Federal Register.

Among the naturalized species of birds not protected by the act are city pigeons, Eurasian collared doves, and house sparrows.

== Legal cases ==
One issue involves a small uninhabited island in the Pacific Ocean known as Farallon de Medinilla located 150 miles (240 km) north of Guam. The target range there is the United States Pacific Fleet's only U.S.-controlled range available, and conveniently accessible from bases in Guam, for live-fire training. In addition, the air and sea space in the Farallon de Medinilla area provides sufficient room for the many different attack profiles which need to be rehearsed. During the peak of Vietnam War operations, ordnance delivered on the island was estimated at 22 tons per month, but is considerably less now.

The U.S. Navy has far more mitigation procedures to prevent environmental damage in the present day than they did in the 1960s. In compliance with the National Environmental Policy Act of 1969 they prepared an Environmental Impact Statement. However, the Navy could not guarantee that no bird protected by the MBTA would be killed, despite the precautions. The Fish and Wildlife Service could not grant a permit without such a guarantee, and no permit has been issued. The Navy argued that it had done its best to comply with environmental laws, and should be permitted to operate under the Impact Statement prepared for NEPA. Vice Speaker Joseph P. DeLeon Guerrero, R-Saipan, noted that the U.S. military "is thorough and meticulous in monitoring the impact of the bombing [drills]" on Farallon de Medinilla.

Earthjustice sued for a temporary restraining order of tests because the Navy did not comply with the MBTA, although they did comply with the other environmental laws. As a result, a law was introduced by congress (H.R. 4546) to amend the Migratory Bird Treaty Act of 1918 to make it lawful for the Department of Defense to "take migratory birds during a 'military readiness activity.'" (Readiness activities are defined as all training activities and military operations related to combat and the testing of equipment for combat use.) The record in congress noted that "A recent federal court ruling indicated that the Navy had violated the Migratory Bird Treaty Act by incidentally taking migratory birds without a permit during training exercises near Guam. The House report indicates that the exemption provision is intended to address the lack of permit authorization for incidental takings, so that essential training exercises may proceed. It appears that the language used in the bill would not authorize the issuance of permits, but more broadly would state that the part of the Migratory Bird Treaty Act that articulates unlawful behavior does not apply to a military readiness activity.

== Proposed amendments ==
- To amend the Migratory Bird Treaty Act to exempt certain Alaskan Native articles from prohibitions against sale of items containing nonedible migratory bird parts (H.R. 3109; 113th Congress) – a bill that would allow Alaskan Natives to make and sell traditional handicrafts such as masks, jewelry, clothing, and hunting equipment that are made from parts of migratory birds, particularly feathers. The bill passed in the United States House of Representatives in a voice vote on September 8, 2014.

== See also ==
- Agreed Measures for the Conservation of Antarctic Fauna and Flora
- Convention on Biological Diversity
- Convention on the International Trade in Endangered Species of Wild Flora and Fauna (CITES)
- Endangered Species Act
- Bald and Golden Eagle Protection Act
- Environmental agreement
- Ramsar Convention
- Sinkbox
- Missouri v. Holland
- Migratory Birds Convention Act, the Canadian law implementing the treaty
- Migratory Bird Treaty or Convention
