= World Flute Society =

US-based non-profit organization

- Abbreviation: WFS
- Formation: 2013
- Type: Non-profit organization
- Headquarters: Lead, South Dakota, US
- Members: 987 (2018)
- Executive Director: Kathleen Joyce-Grendahl, DMA
- Staff: 7
- Volunteers: 11
- Website: www.worldflutesociety.org

The World Flute Society (WFS), a successor to the International Native American Flute Association, is a non-profit organization dedicated to cultural flute playing from around the world. WFS has a particular emphasis on the study and development of the Native American flute.

Its primary activities include organizing music-oriented conferences and workshops, production of printed and audio materials, and the publication of the newsletter Overtones.

The WFS is based in Lead, South Dakota, United States.

== Leadership ==
Executive Director: Dr. Kathleen Joyce-Grendahl

Advisory Board: Mary Youngblood, Peter Phippen, Dr. Andra Bohnet, Rhonda Larson, Winne Clement, Eliyahu Sills, and Bryan Akipa

Former Members: Xavier Quijas, Yxayotl of Guadalajara, Kevin Locke, and G. S. Sachdev

Scholar-in-Residence: Michael Graham Allen (Coyote Oldman)

Youth Outreach Coordinator: Victoria Shoemaker

Flute Circle Connection Liaison: Sandi Horton

== Events ==
The World Flute Society hosts a biennial convention in Eau Claire, Wisconsin. The event involves vendors, performers and flute enthusiasts from around the world. Guests showcase skills in cultural as well as non-traditional contemporary flute skills. The event recently added the World Flute Society Music Awards, celebrating musicianship and excellence.

== See also ==
- Native American flute
