= Title 50 of the Code of Federal Regulations =

CFR Title 50 - Wildlife and Fisheries is one of fifty titles comprising the United States Code of Federal Regulations (CFR). Title 50 is the principal set of rules and regulations issued by federal agencies of the United States regarding wildlife and fisheries. Maintained by the Office of the Federal Register, it is available in digital and printed form, and can be referenced online the Electronic Code of Federal Regulations (e-CFR).

== Structure ==
The table of contents, as reflected in the e-CFR updated February 7, 2014, is as follows:

Volume	Chapter	Parts	Regulatory Entity
1	I	1-16	United States Fish and Wildlife Service, Department of the Interior
2		17.1-17.95(a)	United States Fish and Wildlife Service, Department of the Interior
3		17.95(b)	United States Fish and Wildlife Service, Department of the Interior
4		17.95(c)-(e)	United States Fish and Wildlife Service, Department of the Interior
5		19.75(f)-end	United States Fish and Wildlife Service, Department of the Interior
6		17.96-17.98	United States Fish and Wildlife Service, Department of the Interior
7		17.99(a)-(h)	United States Fish and Wildlife Service, Department of the Interior
8		17.99(i)-end	United States Fish and Wildlife Service, Department of the Interior
9		18-199	United States Fish and Wildlife Service, Department of the Interior
10	II	200-227	National Marine Fisheries Service, National Oceanic and Atmospheric Administration, Department of Commerce
11		228-299	National Marine Fisheries Service, National Oceanic and Atmospheric Administration, Department of Commerce
	III	300-399	International Fishing and Related Activities
	IV	400-499	Joint Regulations (United States Fish and Wildlife Service, Department of the Interior and National Marine Fisheries Service, National Oceanic and Atmospheric Administration, Department of Commerce); Endangered Species Committee Regulations
	V	500-599	Marine Mammal Commission
12	VI	600-659	Fishery Conservation and Management, National Oceanic and Atmospheric Administration, Department of Commerce
13		660-end	Fishery Conservation and Management, National Oceanic and Atmospheric Administration, Department of Commerce

== History ==
The CFR was authorized by President Franklin D. Roosevelt on October 11, 1938, as a means to organize and maintain the growing material published by federal agencies in the newly mandated Federal Register. The first volume of the CFR was published in 1939 with general applicability and legal effect in force June 1, 1938.

The Office of the Federal Register (OFR) began publishing yearly revisions for some titles in 1963 with legal effective dates of January 1 each year. By 1967 all 50 titles were updated annually and effective January 1.

The CFR was placed online in 1996. The OFR began updating the entire CFR online on a daily basis in 2001.
