= List of North American folk music traditions =

This is a list of folk music traditions, with styles, dances, instruments and other related topics. The term folk music can not be easily defined in a precise manner; it is used with widely varying definitions depending on the author, intended audience and context within a work. Similarly, the term traditions in this context does not connote any strictly defined criteria. Music scholars, journalists, audiences, record industry individuals, politicians, nationalists and demagogues may often have occasion to address which fields of folk music are distinct traditions based along racial, geographic, linguistic, religious, tribal or ethnic lines, and all such peoples will likely use different criteria to decide what constitutes a "folk music tradition". This list uses the same general categories used by mainstream, primarily English-language, scholarly sources, as determined by relevant statements of fact and the internal structure of works.

These traditions may coincide entirely, partially or not at all with geographic, political, linguistic or cultural boundaries. Very few, if any, music scholars would claim that there are any folk music traditions that can be considered specific to a distinct group of people and with characteristics undiluted by contact with the music of other peoples; thus, the folk music traditions described herein overlap in varying degrees with each other.

Country	Elements	Dance	Instrumentation	Other topics
Aanishanabe	See Ojibwa	–	–	–
African American	blues - blues-harp - boat song - field holler - fife and drum band - freedom song - funereal music - gospel - lining out - shape-note - Shout - spiritual - work song	blues dance - hambone - juba dance - ring dance - shout	banjo - bones - cowbell - diddley bow - fiddle - harmonica - tambourine - washtub bass	blue note - camp meeting - Election Day celebration - Great Awakening - Pinkster
Anglo-American	ballad - folk hymn - protest song - sea shanty - shape note - singing	barn dance - Country-western two-step - longways - jig - reel - square dance	fiddle - flute - guitar - harpsichord - violin	Caller - Shakers
Apache			Apache fiddle - pot drum - water drum	
Appalachian	ballad - Blue Ridge fiddling - bluegrass - Child ballad - close harmony - folk hymn - jug band - lining out - North Georgia fiddling - old-time music - scolding ballad - shape note - singing - string band	clogging	autoharp - banjo - cello - cornstalk fiddle - dulcimer - fiddle - flute - guitar - harmonica - mandolin	folk revival - hillbilly
Arapaho	Ghost Dance - peyote song	rabbit dance - round dance - snake dance - Sun Dance - turtle dance		Ghost Dance
Blue Ridge	See Appalachian	–	–	–
Cajun		polka - two-step - waltz	accordion - fiddle - guitar - spoons - triangle - washboard	
Cape Breton	See Irish- and Scottish-Canadian	–	–	–
Cherokee		stomp dance	rattle	
Chickasaw		stomp dance		
Chippewa	See Ojibwa	–	–	–
Choctaw		stomp dance		
Cree			fiddle	
Dakota	See Sioux	–	–	–
Dinéh	See Navajo	–	–	–
English-American	See Anglo-American	–	–	–
Finnish-American	See Finnish	–	–	–
French-American	See French	–	–	–
German- and Moravian-American	collegia musica - cornet band - Moravian funereal music - trombone choir		hautboy - kettle drum - trumpet - viol	Ephrata Cloister - liederkranz - Singstunde
Hopi	See Pueblo	–	–	–
Illinois		calumet dance		berdache - calumet
Inuit	ayaya - kattajaq - pisiq - throat-singing	drum dance - jig - kalattuut - reel	accordion - drum	angakkog
Irish- and Scottish-Canadian	ballad - Cape Breton fiddling - emigrant ballad - sean nos - shape note	reel - step dance - strathspey	fiddle	ceilidh
Irish-American	ballad - emigrant ballad - sean nos	clogging - hornpipe - jig - reel - step dance - square dance	banjo - dulcimer - fiddle - guitar - harmonica - mandolin	
Iroquois		Eagle Dance - Quiver Dance - Warrior's Stomp Dance	drum - rattle - water drum	
Italian-American	See Italy	–	–	–
Japanese-American	See Japanese	–	–	–
Jewish-American	cantorial chant - klezmer	bulgar - doina - freylekh - hora - khosidl - mazurka - nigun - polka - sirba - waltz	cello - clarinet - double bass - flute - tsimbl - violin	badkhn - Freygish - kapelye
Lakota	See Sioux	–	–	–
Louisiana Creole	la la - mellows - zydeco.	bamboula - ring dance	accordion - fiddle - guitar - washboard	Congo Square - fais-do-do
Maritime Canada	Cape Breton fiddling - milling song	jig - reel	accordion - fiddle - piano	
Menomini			water drum	
Metis		step dance	fiddle	
Mexican, Mejicano, Hispanic, New Mexico and Tejano	alabado - bravata - California mission music - conjunto - copla - corrido - estribillo - huapango arribeño - jarabe - letra - mariachi - Matachines - Mexican son - pirekua - son huasteco - sones abajeños - sones calentanos - sones de arpa grande - sones istmeños - son jaliscense - son jarocho - topada - vallena - zandunga	chotis - jarabe tapatío - jarana - Matachines - mazurka - polka - raspa - redowa - waltz - xtoles - zandunga - zapateado	accordion - angelus bell - bajo sexto - fiddle - harp - huapanguera - jarana - guitarra quinta - guitarrón - mission bell - requinto - vihuela - violin	trovadore - vaquero
Moravian-American	See German-American	–	–	–
Navajo	gift song - signal song - sway song - Yeibichai	circle dance - Squaw Dance	pot drum - rattle - water drum	Blessingway - Enemyway - Ghostway - hataałii - hózhǫ́ - Nightway - Yeibichai
New England	folk hymn - lining out - Old Way of Singing - psalmody - shape note	barn dance		
Newfoundland	ballad - sea shanty - sean nos	hornpipe - jig - reel - step dance - square dance	bodhrán - fiddle - guitar - harmonica - accordion - spoons	
New Mexico	See Mexican / Hispanic	–	–	–
Ojibwa	war song		water drum	
Omaha		pipe dance		
Pueblo	Matachines - work song	Matachines	Anasazi flute - drum - flageolet	New Mexico - Shalako
Quebecois	accord de pieds			
San Ildefonso	See Pueblo	–	–	–
Santo Domingo	See Pueblo	–	–	–
Scottish-Canadian	See Irish- and Scottish-Canadian	–	–	–
Sioux		Grass Dance- Sun Dance	bell - drum - rattle	
Southern states	ballad - brass band - Delta blues - blues-harp - fife and drum band - folk hymn - jug band - Sacred Harp - shape note - Southern gospel - white spiritual	barn dance - chicken in the breadtray - clogging - fisher's hornpipe - Highland fling - jig - lancer - pigeonwing - polka - quadrille - reel - square dance - waltz	banjo - dulcimer - fiddle - guitar - harmonica - mandolin	singing
Taos Pueblo	See Pueblo	–	–	–
Tejano, sometimes called Tex-Mex	See Mexican	–	–	–
Tohono O'odham	chicken scratch (waila) - conjunto	chotis - mazurka - polka - waila	accordion - bass guitar - drum - fiddle - guitar	piest
Ukrainian-American and Canadian	See Ukrainian	–	–	–
Western Canada and the United States	cattle call - cowboy song - frontier ballad - holler - waltz - Western swing - work song	square dance	accordion - banjo - fiddle - guitar - harmonica	Caller - Chisholm Trail - cowboy poetry - medicine show
Yaqui		Danza del Venado		
Zuni	See Pueblo	–	–	–

== See also ==
- American folk music
- Folk music
