= List of American Indian music by group =

This is a list of American Indian music by group or tribal nation. See: American Indian music.

- Aleut music: people
- Algonquin music: people
  - Menominee music: people
  - Odawa music: people
  - Ojibwe music: people
  - Potawatomi music: people
- Apache music: people
- Arapaho music: people
- Assiniboine music: people
- Blackfoot music: people
- Cahto music: people
- Cahuilla music: people
- Cherokee music: people
- Cheyenne music: people
- Chickasaw music: people
- Chinookan music: people
- Choctaw music: people
- Chumash music: people
- Comanche music: people
- Cree music: people
- Creek music: people
- Crow music: people
- Dene music: people
- Haida music: people
- Innu music: people
- Eskimo/Inuit-Yupik/Iñupiat/Yupik/Inuit music: Eskimo/Inuit-Yupik/Inuit/Iñupiat/Yupik
  - Yup'ik dance
- Iroquois music: people
  - Cayuga music: people
  - Mohawk music: people
  - Oneida music: people
  - Onondaga music: people
  - Seneca music: people
  - Tuscarora music: people
- Kiowa music: people
- Klamath music: people
- Kootenai music: people
- Kwakwaka'wakw music: people
- Miami music: people
- Métis music: people
- Navajo music: people
- Nez Perce music: people
- Nuxalk music: people
- Omaha music: people
- Osage music: people
- Ottawa music: people
- Paiute music: people
- Pawnee music: people
- Pomo music: people
- Potawatomi music: people
- Pueblo music: people
  - Hopi music: people
  - Taos Pueblo music: Taos Pueblo
  - Zuni music: people
- Seminole music: people
- Shawnee music: people
- Shoshone music: people
- Sioux music: people
  - Dakota music: people
  - Nakota music: people
- Tlingit music: people
- Tohono O'odham music: people
- Ute music: people
- Yaqui music: people
- Yuman music: people
