= Arapaho music =

Music of Arapaho people

The Arapaho are a tribe of Native Americans from the western Great Plains, in the area of eastern Colorado and Wyoming. Traditional Arapaho music, described by Bruno Nettl (1965, p. 150), includes sacred and secular songs. Traditional music uses terraced descent type melodic motion, with songs consisting of two sections, each with a range of more than an octave and scales of four to six tones.

== Sun Dance ==
The Arapaho Sun Dance, performed in the summer when the Arapaho bands come together for the occasion, is a ceremony performed in order to guide warriors on a vision, receiving a guardian spirit. The vision is inspired by intense self-torture.

There are also Arapaho folk songs taught by guardian spirits, which are only supposed to be sung when the recipient is near death.

== Secular music ==
Secular Arapaho songs include a wide variety of round dances in triple meter, the snake dance, the rabbit dance (a partner dance introduced after European contact) and a turtle dance, along with lullabies, children's, war, historical, and courtship songs.

== Ghost Dance ==
Ghost Dance and gambling song from the Piute and Arapaho Native Americans
"From the Library of Congress: Emile Berliner and the Birth of the Recording Industry Collection; performed by James Mooney (possibly along with Charles Mooney) on July 5, 1894; neither are believed to be Native Americans

The Ghost Dance was a religion, introduced from tribes further west than the Arapaho in the 1880s. In 1891, the religion was outlawed by the United States, leading to a rebellion among the adherents and culminating in the Wounded Knee Massacre. Music was an integral part of the Ghost Dance, and included folk songs that were retained long after the movement ended (ibid, 151). Another song is Ani Kuni.

== Peyote songs ==
Peyote is a cactus found natively in Mexico. The buttons of the cactus, when chewed, act as a hallucinogen used in the ancient Aztec religion and continued by area tribes to the present. Peyote ceremonies spread north and east, reaching the Apache tribes in the 18th century and then spreading to most every tribe in North America, along with some Apache music and Plains-Pueblo characteristics. Peyote songs accompany the peyote ceremonies, and are mostly the same throughout the area of peyote's entheogenic use. These songs are most similar to traditional songs of the Plains area, but are characterized by a rapid rhythm composed of two note values, transcribed as quarter and eighth notes. Vocables, or non-lexical syllables are used, as are cadential and closing formulas.
