= Sioux music =

Music of the Lakota, Dakota and Nakota

Sioux music prominently features the human voice, with songs accompanied by drumming.

The Sioux are a large group of Native Americans generally divided into three subgroups: Lakota, Dakota and Nakota. They live on the northern prairies of North and South Dakota, Montana, Minnesota, and Nebraska, as well as Alberta, Saskatchewan, and Manitoba.

== Overview ==
Among the Dakota, traditional dance songs generally begin in a high pitch, led by a single vocalist (solo) who sings a phrase that is then repeated by a group. This phrase then cascades to a lower pitch until there is a brief pause. Then, the song's second half, which echoes the first, is sung (incomplete repetition). The second part of the song often includes "honor beats," usually in the form of four beats representing cannon fire in battle. The entire song may be repeated several times, at the discretion of the lead singer.

Many songs use only vocables, syllabic utterances with no lexical meaning. Sometimes, only the second half of the song has any lyrics. Other times, it is a Lakota lullaby, which is usually a calming hum.

In some traditional songs, women sing one octave above the men, though they do not sing the first time the song is sung or the lead line at any time.

Percussion among the Dakota use drums, sometimes with syncopation. In some contest songs, particularly men’s traditional, chicken, and fancy, beats start off as an irregular ruffle and are then followed by a swift regular beat.

The Lakota Flag Song begins special events, such as powwows, and is not accompanied by a dance. Other kinds of songs honor veterans, warriors or others.

Non-Powwow types of Dakota songs include Sun dance, Yuwipi, Inipi, courtship, flute, lullaby, peyote, and Christian hymns.

== Singers ==
Predominate traditional singers and groups and their corresponding tribes or nations include;

- Earl Bullhead, Lakota
- Porcupine Singers, Lakota
- Tianna Spotted Thunder, Lakota
- Lakota Thunder, Lakota
- James Iron Shell, Lakota
- Fort Peck Sioux, Fort Peck Assiniboine and Sioux
- Elk Soldier, Dakota
- Red Leaf Singers, Lakota
- Common Man Singers, Lakota
- Bad Nation, Dakota and Lakota
- Crazy Horse Singers, Lakota
- White Bull, Lakota
- ShowTime, Lakota
- Chiniki Lake Singers, Nakota
