= Blackfeet music =

Music of the Blackfoot people

Blackfoot music is the music of the Blackfoot people (best translated in the Blackfoot language as nitsínihki – "I sing", from nínihksini – "song"). Singing predominates and was accompanied only by percussion.

Ethnomusicologist Bruno Nettl proposes that Blackfoot music is an "emblem of the heroic and the difficult in Blackfoot life", with performance practices that strongly distinguish music from the rest of life. Singing is strongly distinguished from speech and many songs contain no words, and those with texts often describe important parts of myths in a succinct manner. Music is associated closely with warfare and most singing is done by men and much by community leaders. "The acquisition of songs as associated with difficult feats—learned in visions brought about through self-denial and torture, required to be learned quickly, sung with the expenditure of great energy, sung in a difficult vocal style—all of this puts songs in the category of the heroic and the difficult."

== Instrumentation ==
Blackfoot music is primarily vocal, using few instruments (called ninihkiátsis, derived from the word for song and associated primarily with European-American instruments), only percussion and voice, and few words. By far the most important percussion instruments are drums (isttókimaa’tsis), with rattles (awanáá) and bells often being associated with the objects, such as sticks or dancers legs, they are attached to rather than as instruments of their own.

=== Singing ===
Singing consists mostly of vocables, though recordings and reports from the early 1900s and prior indicate there were a great deal more lyrics or vocal texts. Blackfoot people see the profusion of words in European American music and African American music as lessening the importance and meaning of both words and music; and the same for the manner of listening to such music, that is, for entertainment or enjoyment, often while doing other things: if someone needed to say so many words, why didn't they just talk. Blackfoot music is not based on instruments or texts, and singing is not supposed to sound like talking (or imitate any other sound). Typically, songs which contain texts are short and not repetitive, such as: "It's a bad thing to be an old man", 1951 recording of a Crazy Dog Society song) or the relatively lengthy, "Yonder woman, you must take me. I am powerful. Yonder woman, you must take me, you must hear me. Where I sit is powerful" (Wissler and Duvall 1909:85 sung by a rock to a woman in the buffalo-rock myth). Often when the text takes up most of the melody with fewer vocables the melodies are short. The vocables used, as in Plains Indigenous singing, are the consonants h, y, w, and vowels. They avoid n, c (ts) and other consonants. i and e tend slightly to be higher in pitch, a, o, and u lower.

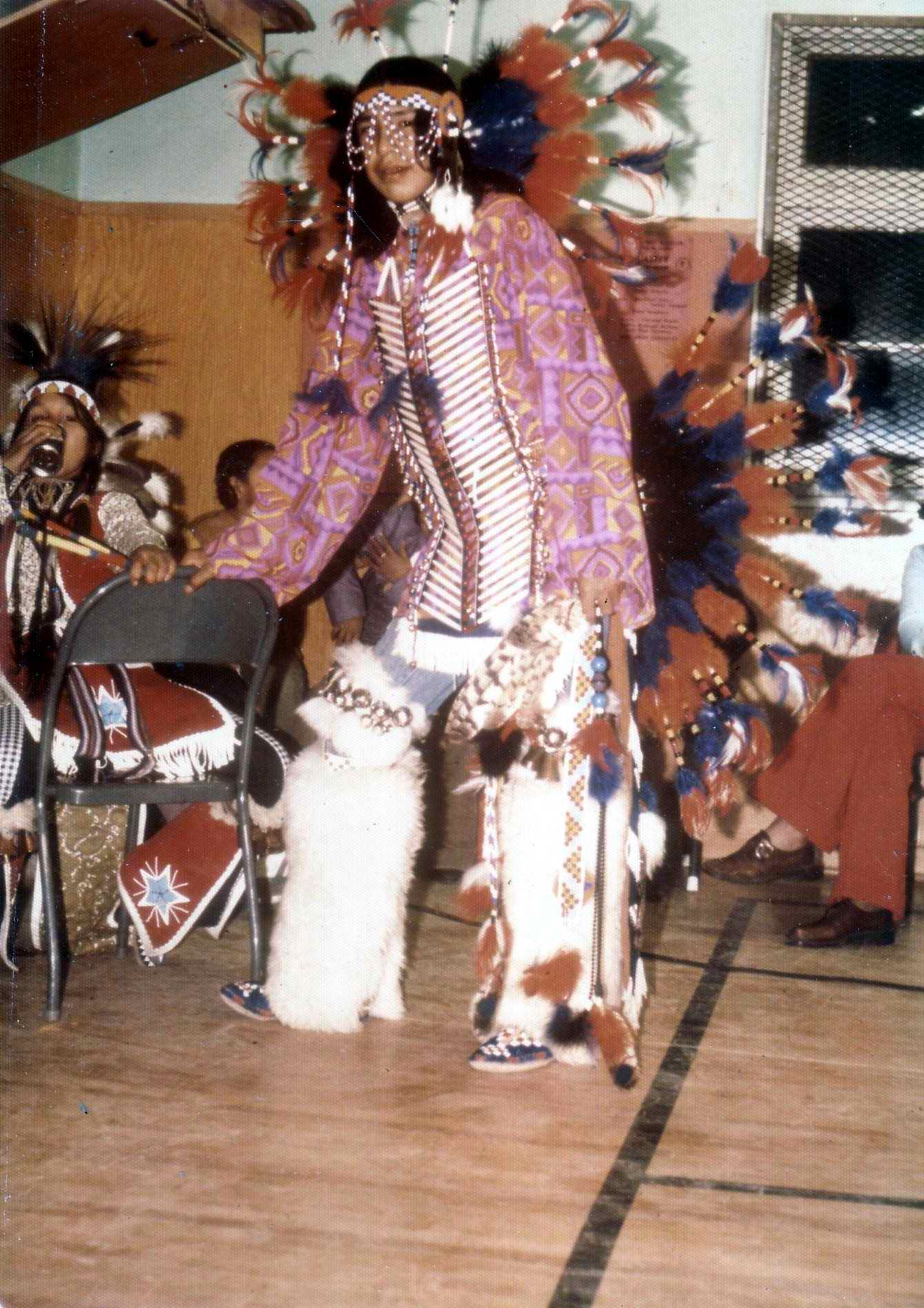
Blackfoot dancer, Alberta 1973

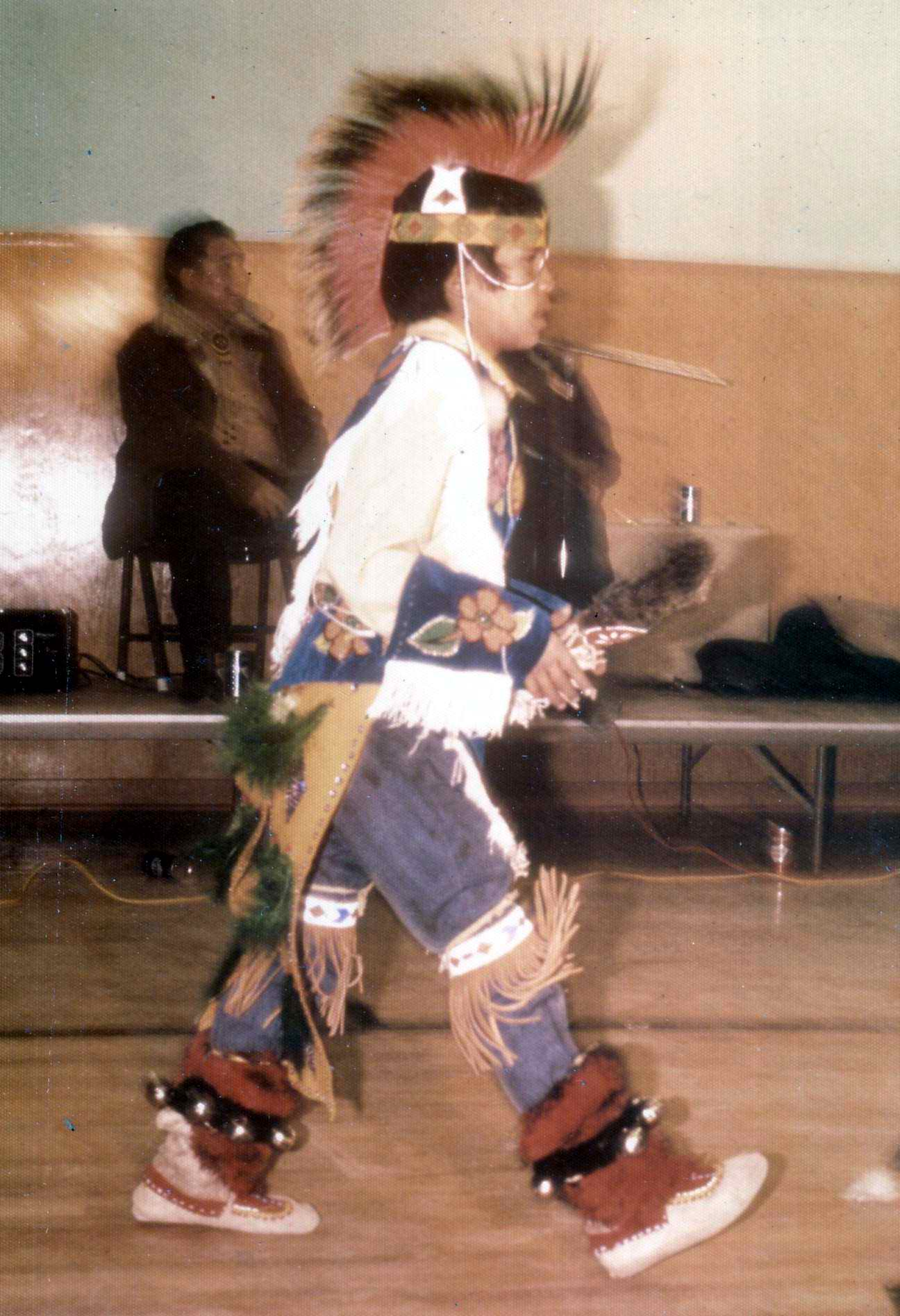
Young Blackfoot dancer, Alberta. 1973

Solo singing may have been more prominent, or the norm, in the past, but group singing has increased in prominence, with singing/drumming groups called "drums". Vocal blending is not required in ensemble singing. The leader may begin the head motive or phrase of a song, and then be repeated or "raised" by another singer, possibly the second singer. In pan-Indigenous powwow terminology, stanzas to a song are often called "push-ups".

==== Vocal style ====
The vocal style is similar to other Plains Indigenous nations with: "high-pitched beginnings, pulsations, vocal narrowness. [and] nasality." "Pulsations on longer tones, the audible effects of tension, nasality, substantial rasp, and some ornamentation are characteristic." Though this may have become "exaggerated" through influence from Plains Indigenous music and pan-Indigenous music, Blackfoot singing is "more intense and uses a higher tessitura", than most Plains Indigenous music. From comparison of recordings one would agree with older consultants in the latter 1900s: "These younger fellows, they sing higher and louder than we used to.". Experimentation with European influenced instrumentation and harmony happen but are rare, and the vocal style is the element least tampered with it being considered essential to sound like traditional Indigenous music. Though the European influenced concept of meter may be inapplicable to Blackfoot music as it is characterized by the relationships between phrases usually of irregular length, the beat level generally equals the rate at which vocal pulsations occur.

=== Drumming ===
Singing without drums is extremely rare and considered inappropriate. The drum accompaniment to songs is rhythmically independent to the singing but in perfect unison, "slightly off the beat", and "often related roughly by the proportion of 2:3", to the vocal pulse or beat level (though see Pantaleoni, 1987). Another change in Blackfoot music is increased relatedness of the drum part to the song now than in the past. Often drumming over repeated sections that comprise a song begins with players softly striking the rim of the bass drum. The tempo increases as the drumming moves further to the center of the drum skin. At some point "hard beats", loud strokes off the rhythm by an individual, sometimes the leader, and beats may be omitted. Drumming may pause for a phrase or two in the last stanza of the last repetition and finish loudly. When playing the stick game, players drum upon a plank, and the drumming is more likely to coincide with vocal beats, but less accurate unison playing. Rattles are no longer used.

Drumming has increased in prominence since 1900, now being virtually required, possibly because of the influence of pan-tribal culture, the decreased use of rattles and other percussion, or the decrease in frequency of songs texts. The use of the term "drumming" for musician/singer also increased between the 1960s and the 1980s.

== Song composition ==
Traditionally, songs are considered to be given, completed, to individual Blackfoot people in visions or dreams. Though it is now accepted that music, especially white music, may be composed in the European influenced sense, the traditional view still greatly affects how songs and their creation or origin are considered. Songs are considered somewhat like objects, in that they may be created of components, but once finished become a unity. They may also be "given" or even sold. Some songs belong to everyone, some songs to just one person but may be sung by others, and some songs individuals save until times of great need. Two songs which may be aurally identical may be considered different songs if they have different origins, i.e., came from different visions.

Most songs, except gambling songs which simply repeat "litany-like" one or two phrases, are characterized by an "incomplete repetition" formal pattern, "many of them can ultimately be reduced to a binary form in which the section is a variation and/or reduction of the first.". However, there was more formal variation in the past. Songs sung with medicine basket openings and gamblings songs often use isometric and isorhythmic rhythmic structures or lesser note-length values. Typically songs begin in falsetto before singers move to their head voices. Octave equivalence appears to be used, as transposition down by an octave of subsequent repetitions of a section is common, though may also occur down a perfect fourth or perfect fifth. Songs begin with a "head motif" repeated by the second singer and then used to "generate" the rest of the song in ways which are fairly predictable to Blackfoot listeners, which facilitates accomplishing the ideal of learning songs in one hearing.

== Genres and repertoire ==
Children do not have their own song or game song repertoire, except for Mice Songs associated with one game, and songs usually called lullabies sung to them by their mothers. Women used to have their own small repertoire of lullabies, laments, and other songs, but these have been largely lost. Two-Spirit "manly-hearted women" (Lewis, 1941) who act in much of the social roles of men, were in the past also willing to sing alone and use a men's singing style.

== Musical thought ==
The basic musical unit in Blackfoot music is the song, and musicians, people who sing and drum, are called singers or drummers with both words being equivalent and referring to both activities. Women, though increasingly equal participants, are not called singers or drummers and it is considered somewhat inappropriate for women to sing loudly or alone. Páskani – "dance" or "ceremony" – often implicitly includes music and is often applied to ceremonies with little dancing and much singing.

Blackfoot musical thought is also more enumerative than European influenced musical thought which tends to be more hierarchical. Songs are differentiated primarily by use: in ceremonies, often associated with specific objects (especially in medicine bundles), concepts, dances, or actions, or during gambling (hand game), or other uses. Songs are differentiated secondarily by association with a person, and thirdly and less commonly by association with a story or event. There are no types of music which are considered more or less music or musical, such as in Iranian musical thought.

Music, singing, is not thought to be like speech, or any other sound at all. There are no spoken introductions or conclusions and no "intermediary forms" between speech and singing.

Rehearsing happens increasingly, likely because of the influence of European influenced concepts of performance, song origin or composition, and a change in the purpose of music: from communication with the supernatural to communication with other humans.

== Ethnography ==
As the Blackfoot are one of the most studied American Indigenous groups there are many collections of Blackfoot music, the largest being at the Archives of Traditional Music at Indiana University. Historical comparisons may be made as the earliest recordings of Blackfoot music were done on wax cylinders. The first recordings, by George Bird Grinnell in 1897, are of James White Calf or others singing around forty songs in or around the Blackfoot Nation. The second set of recordings, by Clark Wissler in 1903 and 1904 contains 146 cylinders, part of his larger studies and the third, by J.K. Dixon of the Wanamaker Expedition No. 2 in 1909, includes several songs sung mostly by Chief Bull at the Crow Agency. The next big collection, by Jane Richardson Hanks accompanied by husband Lucien Hanks in 1938, was recorded in Gleichen, Alberta among the Canadian Blackfoot and featured Spumiapi ("White-Headed Chief"). After the invention of the tape recorder thousands of songs where recorded by Indigenous persons, ethnomusicologists, hobbyists and students, and record companies.

Though these recordings are countless there are chronological gaps (1910–1950), complex music and culture changed rapidly, and the various groups are treated unevenly. Additionally there are few studies of the musical culture (most recordings being made as part of ethnographic studies), mostly by Bruno Nettl.

Public interest in Blackfoot music is indicated by the release of two records (17611 and 17635), recorded unexplainably in New York in 1914. Beginning in the 1950s professional singing groups were formed.

== Current traditional musical groups and musicians ==
- Black Lodge Singers
- Blackfoot Confederacy
- Heart Butte Singers
- Young Grey Horse Society
- Two Medicine Lake Singers
- Troy De Roche
- Jack Gladstone (Montana's Traubadour and Blackfeet poet singer)

== Recordings ==
- An Historical Album of Blackfeet Indian Music. Smithsonian Folkways Recordings: FE 34001.
