= Navajo music =

Traditional and contemporary music of the Navajo people

Music made by the Navajo people hails mostly from the Four Corners region of the Southwestern United States and the territory of the Navajo Nation. While it traditionally takes the shape of ceremonial chants and echoes themes found in Diné Bahaneʼ, contemporary Navajo music includes a wide range of genres, ranging from country music to rock and rap, performed in both English and Navajo.

== Traditional ==
Traditional Navajo music is always vocal, with most instruments (which include drums, rattles, rasp, flute, whistle, and bullroarer) used to accompany singing of specific types of song. As of 1982 there were over 1,000 ceremonial practitioners qualified to perform one or more of thirty ceremonials and countless shorter prayer rituals, otherwise known as 'Medicine People', which restore hózhǫ́ which holds the semantic field of 'harmonious condition' and 'beauty', good health, serenity, and balance.

These songs are the most sacred holy songs, the "complex and comprehensive" spiritual literature of the Navajo, may be considered classical music, while all other songs, including personal, patriotic, daily work, recreation, jokes, and less sacred ceremonial songs, may be considered popular music. The "popular" side is characterized by public performance while the holy songs are preserved of their sacredness by reserving it only for ceremonies (and thus not featured on the recording listed at bottom).

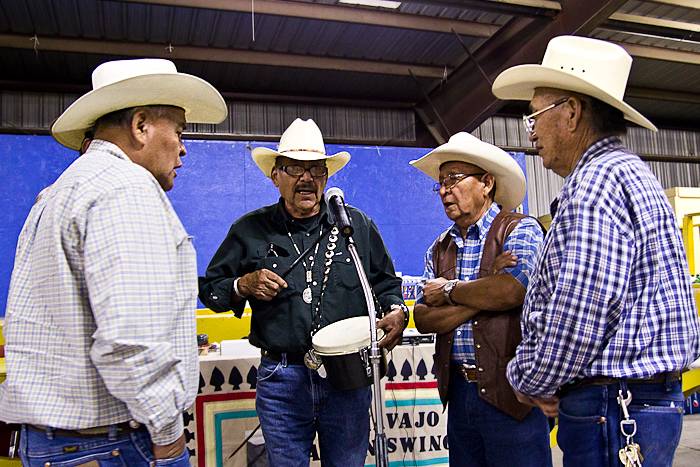
Members of the Navajo Song & Dance singing group "Cross Canyon Echoes" sing for a charity event in Window Rock, Arizona.

The longest ceremonies may last up to ten days and nights while performing rituals that restore the balance between good and evil, or positive and negative forces. The hataałii, aided by sandpaintings or masked yéʼii bicheii, as well as numerous other sacred tools used for healing, chant the sacred songs to call upon the Navajo gods and natural forces to restore the person to harmony and balance within the context of the world forces. In ceremonies involving sandpaintings, the person to be supernaturally assisted, the patient, becomes the protagonist, identifying with the gods of the Diné creation stories, and at one point becomes part of the story cycle by sitting on a sandpainting with iconography pertaining to the specific story and deities.

The lyrics, which may last over an hour and are usually sung in groups, contain narrative epics including the beginning of the world, phenomenology, morality, and other lessons. Longer songs are divided into two or four balanced parts and feature an alternation of chantlike verses and buoyant melodically active choruses concluded by a refrain in the style and including lyrics of the chorus. Lyrics, songs, groups, and topics include cyclic: Changing Woman, an immortal figure in the Navajo traditions, is born in the spring, grows to adolescence in the summer, becomes an adult in the autumn, and then an old lady in the winter, repeating the life cycles over and over. Her sons, the Hero Twins, Monster Slayer and Born-for-the-Water, are also sung about, for they rid the world of giants and evil monsters. Stories such as these are spoken of during these sacred ceremonies.

The "popular" music resembles the highly active melodic motion of the choruses, featuring wide intervallic leaps and melodic range usually an octave to octave and a half. Structurally, the songs are created from the complex repetition, division, and combinations of most often no more than four or five phrases, with short songs often immediately following each other for continuity as needed in work songs. Their lyrics are mostly vocables, with certain vocables specific to genres, but may contain short humorous or satirical texts.

== Shoegame songs ==
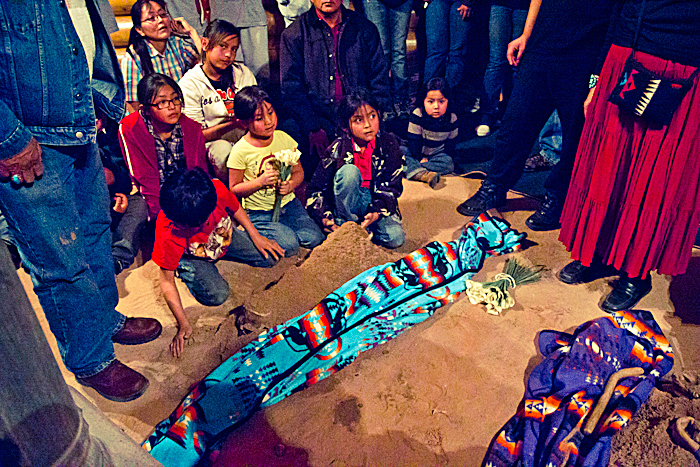
Residents of Fort Defiance, Arizona play a round of Navajo Shoegame.

Long ago when the animals roamed the earth they came together to play Késhjééʼ, or the Navajo moccasin game. Yéʼiitsoh (Giant) and Owl discussed putting a game together and they came up with the Navajo Shoegame. There is a story that goes with this, however it remains only to be heard orally by a Diné.

Today throughout the Navajo Nation, many families play the Navajo Shoegame. At times, local communities play against each other during the winter season. There are also many prominent Navajo Shoegame singers throughout the Navajo Nation. Notably the Nez family of Hunter's Point, Arizona, and Pinedale, New Mexico, who are very well known for their singing and playing of the game. Leo Nez Sr. and his son Titus Jay Nez who come from the Nez family are very well known for their singing of Shoegame songs and attendance of Shoegames throughout the Navajo Nation. Other notable singers include Jimmy Cody of Sweetwater, Arizona, Addison Begay of Sanostee, New Mexico, and Sammie Largo of Tsayatoh, New Mexico.

== Children's songs ==
Navajo children's songs are usually about animals, such as pets and livestock. Some songs are about family members, and about chores, games, and other activities as well. It usually includes anything in a child's daily life. A child may learn songs from an early age from the mother. As a baby, if the child cries, the mother will sing to it while it's tied in the cradleboard. Navajo songs are rhythmic, and therefore soothing to a baby. Thus, songs are a major part of Navajo culture.

It may have been a kind of beginner's course in learning the songs and prayers for self-protection from bad things, skinwalkers, and other evil figures in Navajo traditions. Blessings, such as when one does with corn pollen in the early morning, may be learned as well.

In children's songs, a short chant usually starts off the song, followed by at least one stanza of lyrics, and finishing up with the same chant. All traditional songs include chants, and are not made up solely of lyrics. There are specific chants for some types of songs as well. Contemporary children's songs, however, such as Christmas songs and Navajo versions of nursery rhymes, may have lyrics only. Today, both types of songs may be taught in elementary schools on the reservation, depending on the knowledge and ability of the particular teacher.

In earlier times, Navajo children may have sung songs like these to themselves while sheepherding, to pass the time. Sheep were, and still are, a part of Navajo life. Back then, giving a child custody of the entire herd was a way to teach them leadership and responsibility, for one day they would probably own a herd of their own. A child, idle while the sheep grazed, may sing to pass the time.

== Peyote songs ==
Peyote songs are a form of Native American music, now most often performed as part of the Native American Church, which came to the northern part of the Navajo Nation around 1936. They are typically accompanied by a rattle and water drum, and are used in a ceremonial aspect during the sacramental taking of peyote. Peyote songs share characteristics of Apache music and Plains-Pueblo music.

In recent years, a modernized version of peyote songs have been popularized by Verdell Primeaux, a Sioux, and Johnny Mike, a Navajo.
