= Indigenous music of North America =

Music by Indigenous peoples of North America

- Cultural origins: Indigenous peoples of North America; United States; Canada; Mexico

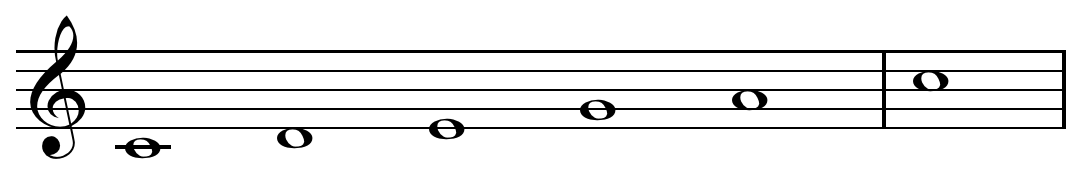
Pentatonic Scale – C Major

Indigenous music of North America, which includes American Indian music or Native American music, is the music that is used, created or performed by Indigenous peoples of North America, including Native Americans in the United States and Aboriginal peoples in Canada, Indigenous peoples of Mexico, and other North American countries—especially traditional tribal music, such as Pueblo music and Inuit music. In addition to the traditional music of the Native American groups, there now exist pan-Indianism and intertribal genres as well as distinct Native American subgenres of popular music including: rock, blues, hip hop, classical, film music, and reggae, as well as unique popular styles like chicken scratch and New Mexico music.

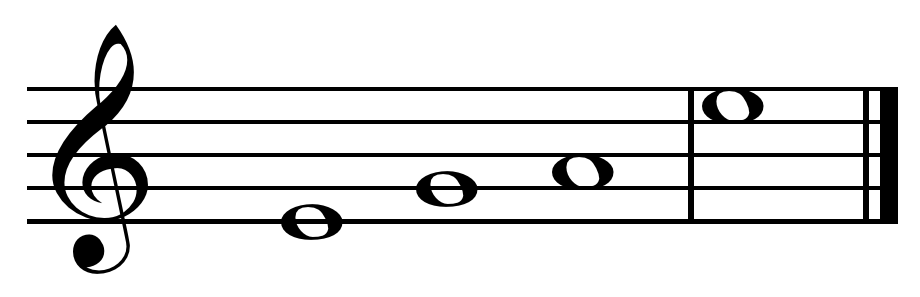
Tritonic Scale - E

== Characteristics ==
Dance Song of the Thompson River Indians
Phonograph cylinder recording of song by Nlaka'pamux in British Columbia, 1897

Eagle Song of the Hopi Indians
Phonograph cylinder recording of song by Hopi Indians in Arizona, 1906

Singing and percussion are the most important aspects of traditional Native American music. Vocalization takes many forms, ranging from solo and choral song to responsorial, unison and multipart singing. Percussion, especially drums and rattles, are common accompaniment to keep the rhythm steady for the singers, who generally use their native language or non-lexical vocables (syllable sounds outside of language). Traditional music usually begins with slow and steady beats that grow gradually faster and more emphatic, while various flourishes like drum and rattle tremolos, shouts and accented patterns add variety and signal changes in performance for singers and dancers.

Although each Native American group can be characterized by their own distinct genres and styles, certain aspects of style can be found with similarities among native groups who would have been neighboring tribes. These similarities are even further expanded upon when music and instruments are shared between each tribe, making it easy to find certain characteristics in frequent use. Melodies usually consist of a different scale than the classical eight-pitch scale of eastern culture, often finding itself in the pentatonic or tritonic scale.

The voice can range from a tense, nasal, or relaxed sound, and consist of higher timbres specifically for male vocalists where falsetto is common. Vocal vibrato, when it occurs, is a rapid pulsating of different pitches as a more ornamental effect. Rhythmic patterns often can be found in meters of two or three and account for the vocal rhythms and syncopation in order to incorporate it into the pattern. Call and response patterns are common in vocal parts and ostinato may be included in the percussion part as well.

Drums consist of types ranging from single headed, double headed, and kettle drums. Other percussive instrumentation consist of rattles and shakers, and made out of things like turtle shells. In addition to percussive instruments and vocals, a common sound in Native American music is instrumentation like flutes, whistles, and other instruments that produce sound from the player's breath (horns, pipes, etc.). Instruments with strings that may be struck, plucked, or bowed include that like the musical bow which originated to the Americas, but does not appear often in contemporary indigenous music. Other stringed instruments include native guitars and fiddles whose structure and composition vary from tribe to tribe.

A study made in 2016 analyzed the musical features of indigenous music in relation to social contexts and lyrical subject. Upon analyzing over 2,000 songs from Frances Densmore's collection of native music, the study was able to find even the relation between subjects like love in songs, and pitch variety and tessitura. Love songs could be characterized with high tessituras and spacious melodies, with larger intervals and ranges. They are also, in many cases, perceived as "sad": pertaining to departure, loss or longing. This explains the relationship between the lyrical subject and relatively slow melodic movement and low dynamics. Hiding-game songs, such as those associated with "moccasin, hand and hiding-stick or hiding-bones games," were found with a significantly low average duration and small pitch range and variety. They also found that "healing songs," and their characteristic of a narrow range and comparatively increased repetition of low notes, was likely intended to create a soothing sound that would ease discomfort in the event when a healing song would be sung. Regarding the music of specific people, they found that Yuman nature songs often have a small range, a descending melodic movement, and frequent repeated musical motifs. The Densmore collection also characterizes war songs as having a wider range, higher register, and greater diversity in duration and pitch. In comparison, dance songs also have these distinctions, although they can be found in the opposite sense, as dance songs are often found with lower registers. Dance songs are also similar to animal songs in range, pitch variety, and primary register.

This study also maintains a significant view that many of these characteristics ("pitch height, tempo, dynamics, and variability") have a direct relationship with emotional response, bringing out such response regardless of culture, meaning that similar characteristics of one culture's music and its function will often be found in another culture's for the same function. This is how Shanahan, Neubarth, and Conklin were able to use Densmore's collection of over 2,000 songs to create an analysis of comparison between subject and musical characteristic.

=== Song texts and sources ===
Native American song texts include both public pieces and secret songs, said to be "ancient and unchanging", which are used for only sacred and ceremonial purposes. There are also public sacred songs, as well as ritual speeches that are sometimes perceived as musical because of their use of rhythm and melody. These ritual speeches often directly describe the events of a ceremony, and the reasons and ramifications of the night.

Vocables, or lexically meaningless syllables, are a common part of many kinds of Native American songs. They frequently mark the beginning and end of phrases, sections or songs themselves. Often songs make frequent use of vocables and other untranslatable elements. Songs that are translatable include historical songs, like the Navajo "Shi' naasha'", which celebrates the end of Navajo internment in Fort Sumner, New Mexico in 1868. Tribal flag songs and national anthems are also a major part of the Native American musical corpus, and are a frequent starter to public ceremonies, especially powwows. Native American music also includes a range of courtship songs, dancing songs and popular American or Canadian tunes like "Amazing Grace", "Jambalaya" and "Sugar Time". Many songs celebrate harvest, planting season or other important times of year.

== Societal role ==
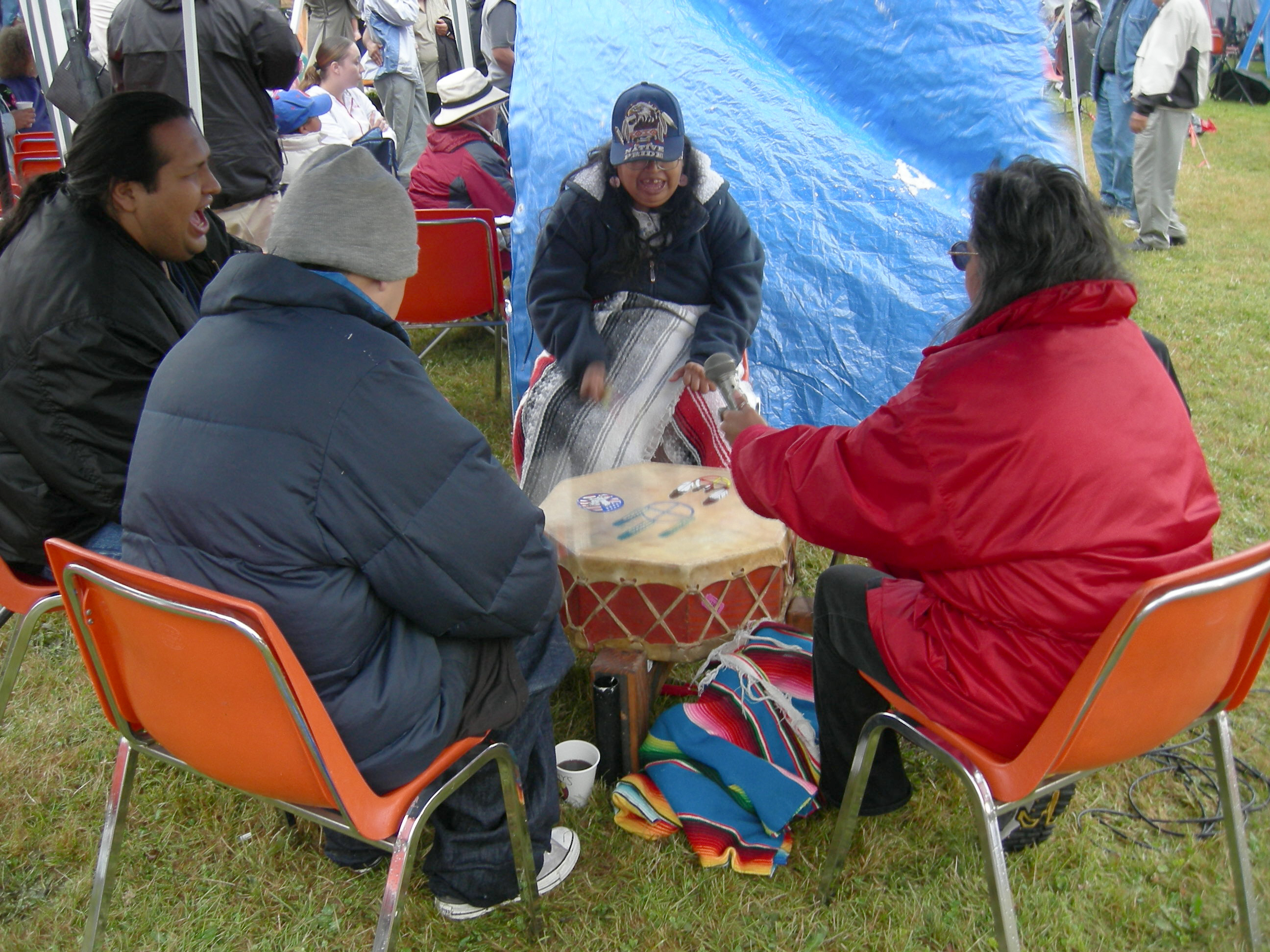
United Indians of All Tribes Foundation drummers at the Seafair Indian Days Pow Wow, Daybreak Star Cultural Center, Seattle, Washington

Native American music plays a vital role in history and education, with ceremonies and stories orally passing on ancestral customs to new generations. Native American ceremonial music is traditionally said to originate from deities or spirits, or from particularly respected individuals. Rituals are shaped by every aspect of a song, dance, and costuming, and each aspect informs about the "makers, wearers and symbols important to the nation, tribe, village, clan, family, or individual". Native Americans perform stories through song, music, and dance, and the historical facts thus propagated are an integral part of Native American beliefs. Epic legends and stories about cultural heroes are a part of tribal music traditions, and these tales are often an iconic part of local culture. They can vary slightly from year to year, with leaders recombining and introducing slight variations. The Pueblo composes a number of new songs each year in a committee that uses dreams and visions.

Some Native Americans view songs as 'property' owned by the tribe or individual who first perceived it. For example, if an individual received the song in a dream or vision, the music would belong to that individual, and that individual would have the power to give the song to another. In other cases, the music would be the property of the peoples from which it originated.

The styles and purposes of music vary greatly between and among each Native American tribe. However, a common concept amongst many indigenous groups is a conflation of music and power. For example, the Akimel O'odham feel many of their songs were given in the beginning and sung by the Creator. It was believed that some people then have more of an inclination to musical talent than others because of an individual's peculiar power.

=== Gender ===
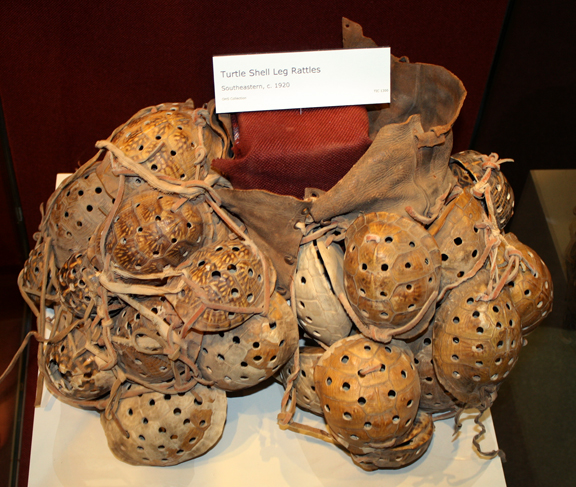
Southeast women's turtle shell leg rattles, ca. 1920, collection of the Oklahoma History Center

Within various Native American communities, gender plays an important role in music. Men and women play sex-specific roles in many musical activities. Instruments, songs and dances are often particular to one or the other sex, and many musical settings are strictly controlled by sex. In modern powwows, women play a vital role as backup singers and dancers. The Cherokee people, for example, hold dances before stickball games. At these pre-game events, men and women perform separate dances and follow separate regulations. Men will dance in a circle around a fire, while women dance in place. Men sing their own songs, while women have their songs sung for them by an elder. Whereas the men's songs invoke power, the women's songs draw power away from the opposing stickball team. In some societies, there are customs where certain ceremonial drums are to be played by men only. For the Southern Plains Indians, it is believed that the first drum was given to a woman by the Great Spirit, who instructed her to share it with all women of native nations. However, there also exist prohibitions against women sitting at the Beg Drum.

Many tribal music cultures have a relative paucity of traditional women's songs and dances, especially in the Northeast and Southeast regions. The Southeast is, however, home to a prominent women's musical tradition in the use of leg rattles for ceremonial stomp and friendship dances, and the women's singing during Horse and Ball Game contests. The West Coast tribes of North America tend to more prominence in women's music, with special women's love songs, medicine songs and handgame songs; the Southwest is particularly diverse in women's musical offerings, with major ceremonial, instrumental and social roles in dances. Women also play a vital ceremonial role in the Sun Dance of the Great Plains and Great Basin, and sing during social dances. Shoshone women still sang the songs of the Ghost Dance into the 1980s.

== History ==
Music and history are tightly interwoven in Native American life. A tribe's history is constantly told and retold through music, which keeps alive an oral narrative of history. These historical narratives vary widely from tribe to tribe and are an integral part of tribal identity. However, their historical authenticity cannot be verified; aside from supposition and some archaeological evidence, the earliest documentation of Native American music came with the arrival of European explorers. Musical instruments and pictographs depicting music and dance have been dated as far back as the 7th century. However, archaeological evidence shows that musical instruments in North America date to at least the Archaic period (ca. 8000–1000 BC), which includes instruments such as turtle shell rattles.

Bruno Nettl refers to the style of the Great Basin area as the oldest style and common throughout the entire continent before Mesoamerica but continued in only the Great Basin and in the lullaby, gambling, and tale genres around the continent. A style featuring relaxed vocal technique and the rise may have originated in Mesoamerican Mexico and spread northward, particularly into the California-Yuman and Eastern music areas. According to Nettl, these styles also feature "relative" rhythmic simplicity in drumming and percussion, with isometric material and pentatonic scales in the singing, and motives created from shorter sections into longer ones.

While this process occurred, three Asian styles may have influenced North American music across the Bering Strait, all featuring pulsating vocal technique and possibly evident in recent Paleo-Siberian tribes such as Chuckchee, Yukaghir, Koryak. Also, these may have influenced the Plains-Pueblo, Athabascan, and Inuit-Northwest Coast areas. According to Nettl, the boundary between these southward and the above northward influences are the areas of greatest musical complexity: the Northwest Coast, Pueblo music, and Navajo music. Evidence of influences between the Northwest Coast and Mexico are indicated, for example, by bird-shaped whistles. The Plains-Pueblo area has influenced and continues to influence the surrounding cultures, with contemporary musicians of all tribes learning Plains-Pueblo-influenced pantribal genres such as Peyote songs.

=== Influence ===
During his time in the United States, composer Antonín Dvořák maintained that the future of the American voice in music lay in African American and Native American music, and supported their growth in the U.S. He had a goal to discover "American Music" and called upon American composers to look to these cultures of music for study and inspiration. (While Native American and African American musical roots are rather different, they share similar characteristics such as featured pentatonic melodies and complex rhythms.)

In this study of the American sound, he wrote:

The music of the people is like a rare and lovely flower growing amidst encroaching weeds. Thousands pass it, while others trample it underfoot, and thus the chances are that it will perish before it is seen by the one discriminating spirit who will prize it above all else.

During this time he also wrote his Symphony No. 9, From the New World, which would become one of his greatest successes.

Before the symphony's performance, he made it clear the fact that 'the work was written under the direct influence of a serious study of the national music of North American Indians.' Although at this time, Dvořák was under the impression that Native American music was more similar to African American music than it truly was, due to the presence of pentatonic melodies in songs of each culture.

== Academic study ==
Archaeological evidence of Native American music dates as far back as the Archaic period (ca. 8000–1000 BC). However, the earliest written documentation comes from the arrival of European explorers on the American continent, and the earliest academic research comes from the late 19th century. During that period, early musicologists and folklorists collected and studied Native American music, and propounded theories about indigenous styles.

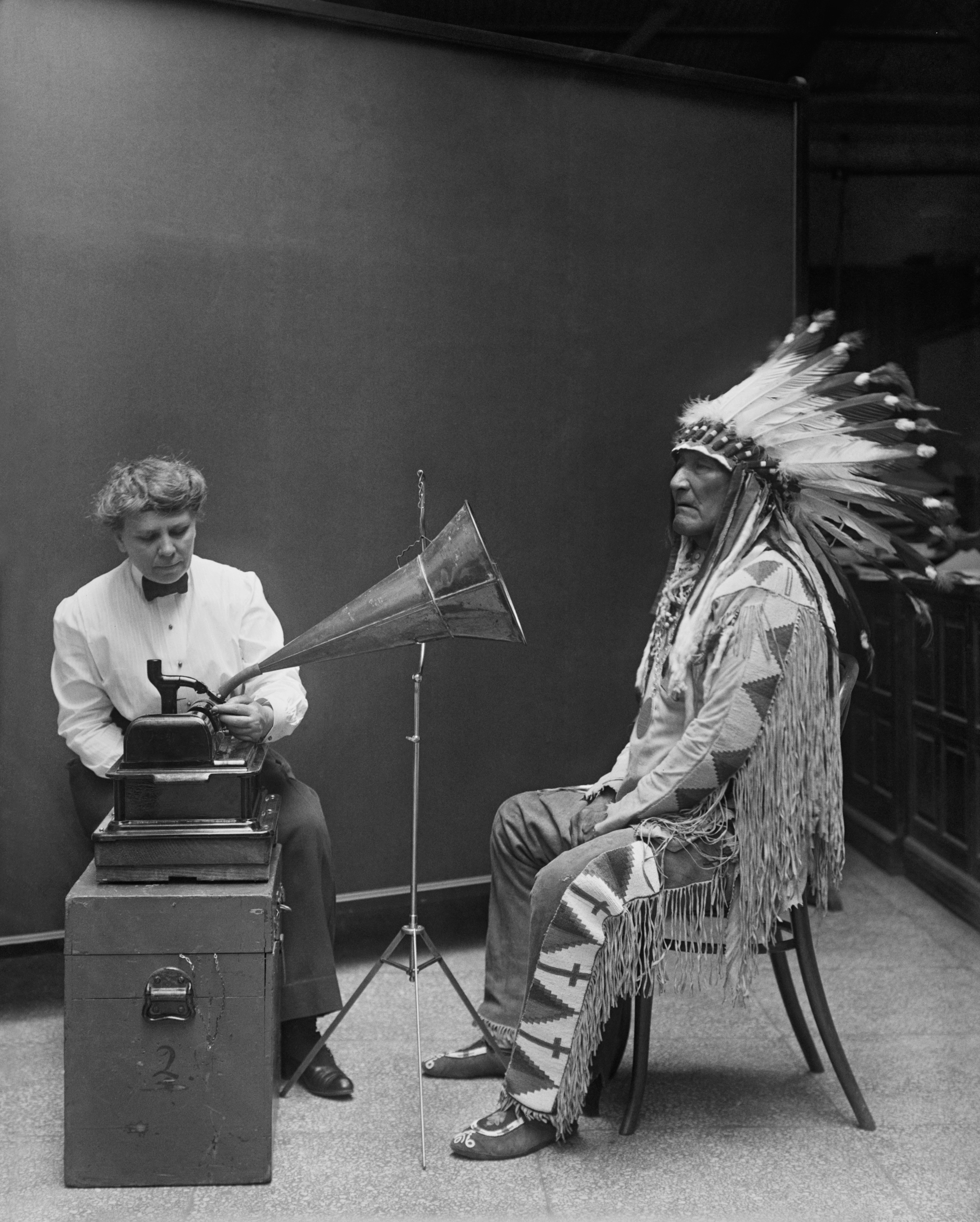
Frances Densmore at the Smithsonian Institution in 1916 where she was recording Blackfoot chief Mountain Chief for the Bureau of American Ethnology. In this picture, Mountain Chief is listening to a recording.

In the early 20th century, more systematic research began. It was led by comparative musicologists like Frances Densmore, Natalie Curtis, George Herzog and Helen Heffron Roberts. Densmore was the most prolific of the era, publishing more than one hundred works on Native American music. As a child, Densmore gained an appreciation for indigenous music by listening to the Dakota peoples, and throughout her life was able to record over a thousand songs performed by Native Americans in fifty plus years, beginning in 1907. One distinction that makes her work so valuable, is that many of her recordings were conducted with more elderly individuals with little influence from Western musical tradition, and involve an impressively large range in geographical origin. Many of the recordings she made are now held in the Library of Congress for researchers and tribal delegations.

Most recently, since the 1950s, Native American music has been a part of ethnomusicological research, studied by Bruno Nettl, William Powers and David McAllester, among others.

== Music areas ==
Nettl uses the following music areas which approximately coincide with Wissler, Kroeber, and Driver's cultural areas: Inuit-Northwest coast, Great Basin, California-Yuman, Plains-Pueblo, Athabascan, and Eastern.

=== Southwest ===
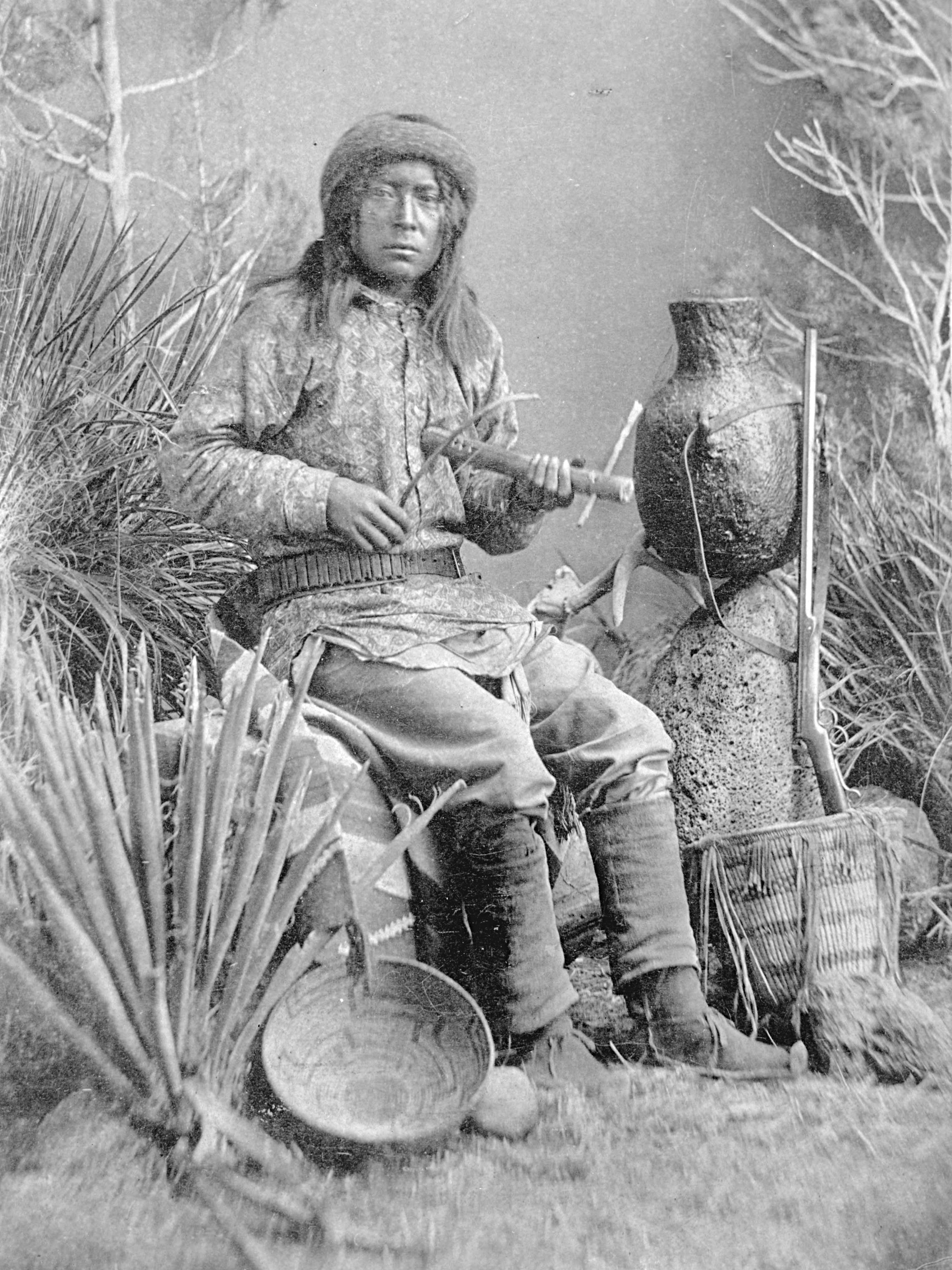
Chasi, a Warm Springs Apache musician playing the Apache fiddle, 1886, photo by A. Frank Randall

Native Americans of the Southwestern United States were limited to idiophones and aerophones as mediums to sound production beginning date in the seventh century. The applicable idiophones included: plank resonators, footed drums, percussion stones, shaken idiophones, vessel rattles, and copper and clay bells. The applicable aerophones included bullroarers, decomposable whistles and flutes, clay resonator whistles, shell trumpets and prehistoric reed instruments. The wood flute was of particular significance.

Arid American Southwest is home to two broad groupings of closely related cultures, the Pueblo and Athabaskan. The Southern Athabaskan Navajo and Apache tribes sing in Plains-style nasal vocals with unblended monophony, while the Pueblos emphasize a relaxed, low range and highly blended monophonic style. Athabaskan songs are swift and use drums or rattles, as well as an instrument unique to this area, the Apache fiddle, or "Tsii'edo'a'tl" meaning "wood that sings" in the Apache language.

Pueblo songs are complex and meticulously detailed, usually with five sections divided into four or more phrases characterized by detailed introductory and cadential formulas. They are much slower in tempo than Athabaskan songs, and use various percussion instruments as accompaniment.

Piute Game Song intended to accompany the action of the game being played

Nettl describes Pueblo music, including Hopi, Zuni, Taos Pueblo, San Ildefonso Pueblo, Santo Domingo Pueblo, and many others, as one of the most complex on the continent, featuring increased length and number of scale tones (hexatonic and heptatonic common), variety of form, melodic contour, and percussive accompaniment, ranges between an octave and a twelfth, with rhythmic complexity equal to the Plains sub-area. He cites the Kachina dance songs as the most complex songs and Hopi and Zuni material as the most complex of the Pueblo, while Tanoan and Keresan music is simpler and intermediate between the Plains and western Pueblos. The music of the Akimel O'odham and Tohono O'odham is intermediary between the Plains-Pueblo and the California-Yuman music areas, with melodic movement of the Yuman, though including the rise, and the form and rhythm of the Pueblo.

He describes Southern Athabascan music, that of the Apache and Navajo, as the simplest next to the Great Basin style, featuring strophic form, tense vocals using pulsation and falsetto, tritonic and tetratonic scales in triad formation, simple rhythms and values of limited duration (usually only two per song), arc-type melodic contours, and large melodic intervals with a predominance of major and minor thirds and perfect fourths and fifths with octave leaps not rare. Peyote songs share characteristics of Apache music and Plains-Pueblo music having been promoted among the Plains by the Apache people.

He describes the structural characteristics of California-Yuman music, including that of Pomo, Miwak, Luiseno, Catalineno, and Gabrielino, and the Yuman tribes, including, Mohave, Yuman, Havasupai, Maricopa, as using the rise in almost all songs, a relaxed nonpulsating vocal technique (like European classical music), a relatively large amount of isorhythmic material, some isorhythmic tendencies, simple rhythms, pentatonic scales without semitones, an average melodic range of an octave, sequence, and syncopated figures such as a sixteenth-note, eight-note, sixteenth-note figure. The form of rise used varies throughout the area, usually being rhythmically related to the preceding non-rise section but differing in melodic material or pitch. The rise may be no higher than the highest pitch of the original section, but will contain a much larger number of higher pitches. In California the non-rise is usually one reiterate phrase, the rise being the phrase transposed an octave higher, the Yumans use a non-rise of long repeated sections each consisting of several phrases, the rise being three to five phrases performed only once, and in southern California the previous two and progressive forms are found. A distinctively Californian instrument is the clapper stick, a percussion instrument made by splitting an elderberry branch used to accompany singers and dancers.

In Southern California today, the traditional music of the Cahuilla is kept alive in the performance of the Bird songs. The Bird songs are a song cycle depicting the story of the southward migration of the Cahuilla people and also contain lessons on life as well as other topics. Altogether, they make up more than 300 pieces of music, traditionally performed in a specific sequence. Performances of the Bird songs would begin at dusk and end at dawn, each night for a week, until the song cycle was complete. As such, physical and vocal dexterity were highly sought after attributes within performers.

=== Eastern Woodlands ===
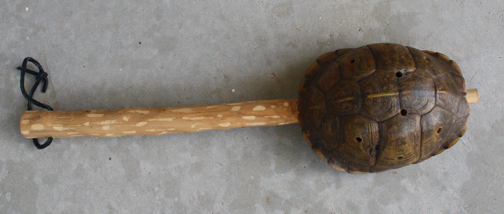
Men's turtleshell rattle, made by Tommy Wildcat (Cherokee-Muscogee-Natchez)

Inhabiting a wide swath of the United States and Canada, Indigenous peoples of the Eastern Woodlands, according to Nettl, can be distinguished by antiphony (call and response style singing), which does not occur in other areas. Their territory includes Maritime Canada, New England, U.S. Mid-Atlantic, Great Lakes and Southeast regions. Songs are rhythmically complex, characterized by frequent metric changes and a close relationship to ritual dance. Flutes and whistles are solo instruments, and a wide variety of drums, rattles and striking sticks are played. Nettl describes the Eastern music area as the region between the Mississippi River and the Atlantic. The most complex styles are that of the Southeastern Creek, Yuchi, Cherokee, Choctaw, Iroquois and their language group, with the simpler style being that of the Algonquian language group including Delaware and Penobscot. The Algonquian-speaking Shawnee have a relatively complex style influenced by the nearby southeastern tribes.

The characteristics of this entire area include short iterative phrases; reverting relationships; shouts before, during, and after singing anhemitonic pentatonic scales; simple rhythms and meter and, according to Nettl, antiphonal or responsorial techniques including "rudimentary imitative polyphony". Melodic movement tends to be gradually descending throughout the area and vocals include a moderate amount of tension and pulsation.

=== Plains ===
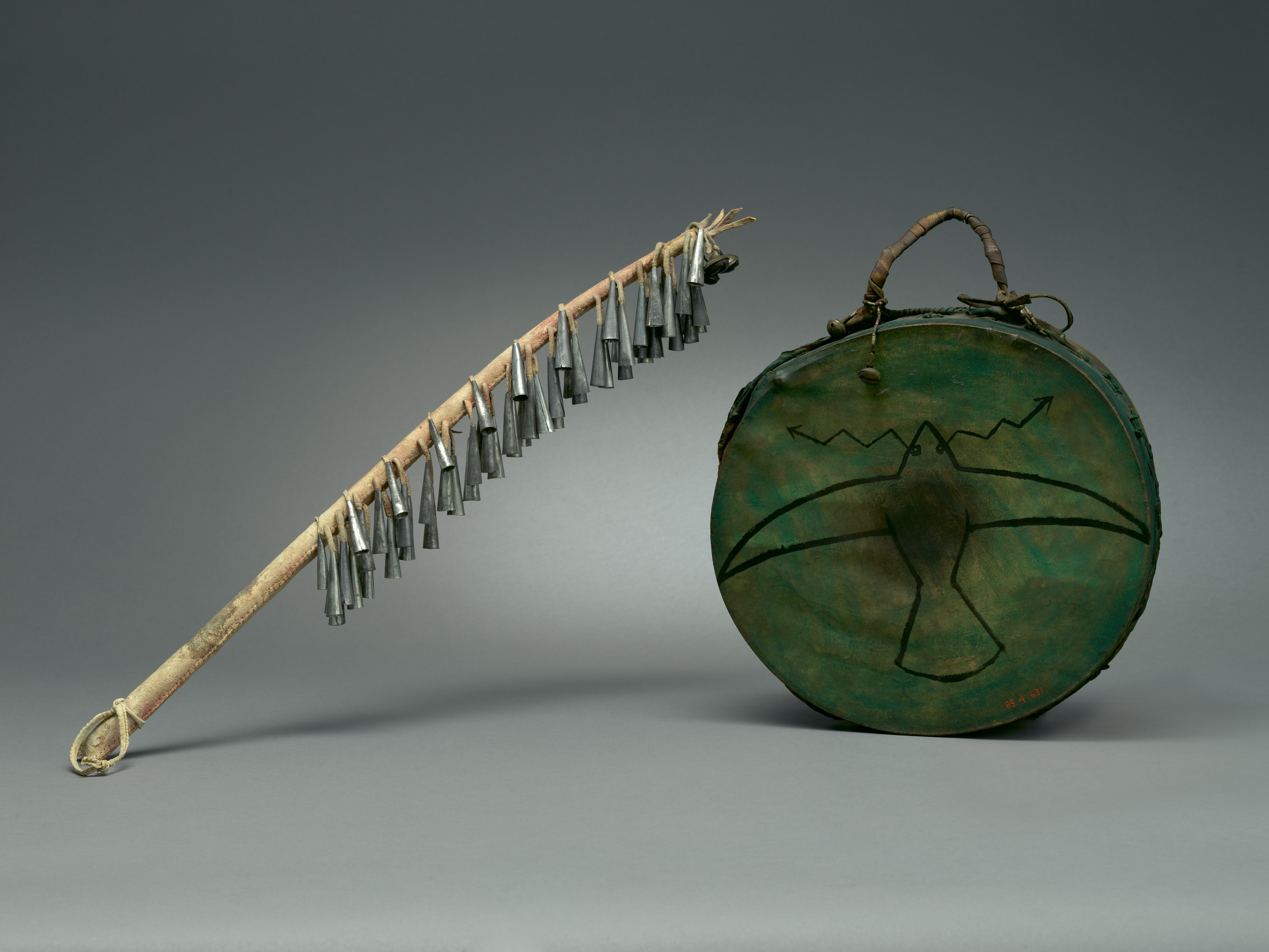
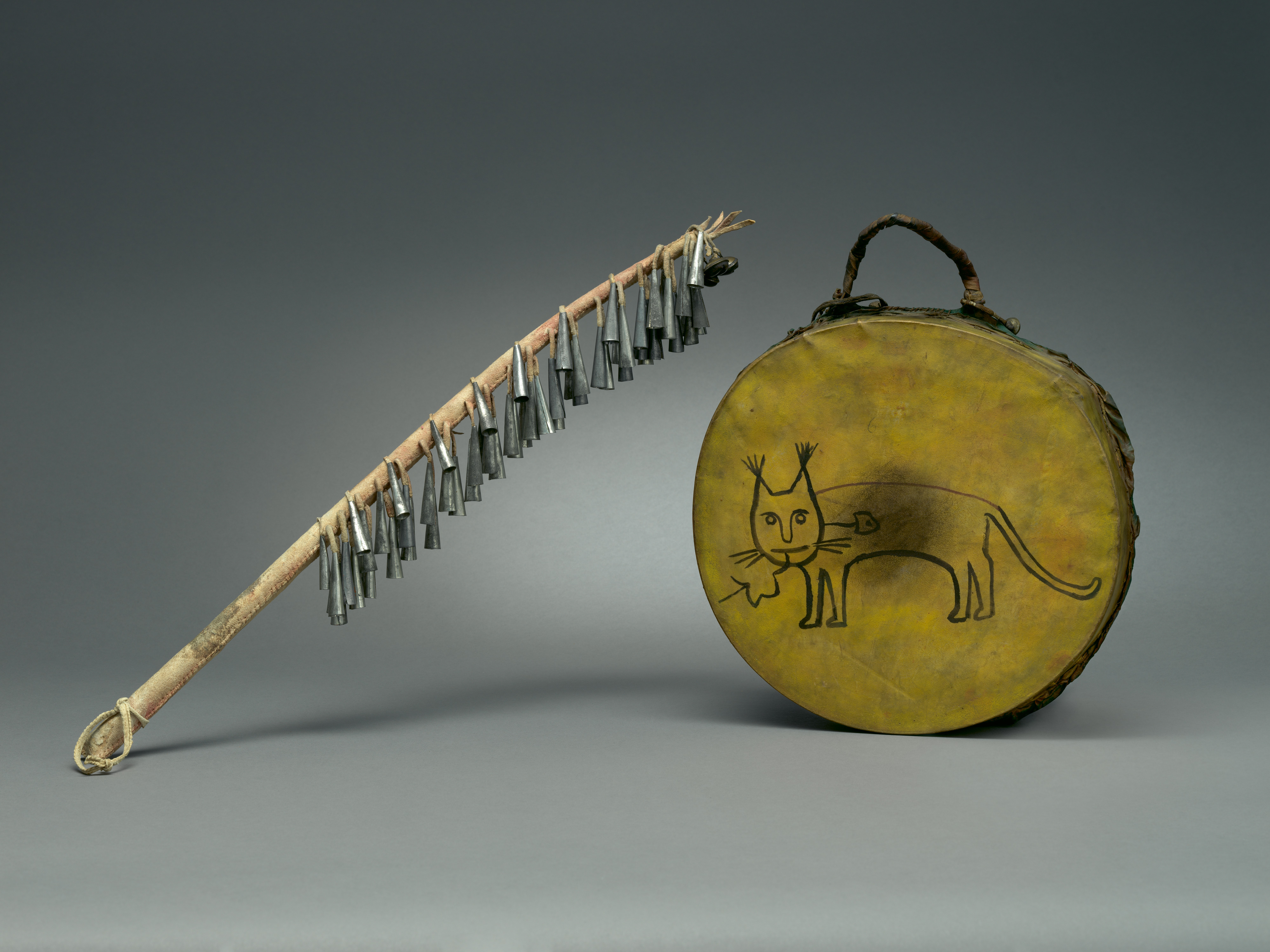
Wakan-chan-cha-gha (frame drum), Sioux or Dakota tribe

Extending across the American Midwest into Canada, Plains-area music is nasal, with high pitches and frequent falsettos, with a terraced descent (a step-by-step descent down an octave) in an unblended monophony. Strophes use incomplete repetition, meaning that songs are divided into two parts, the second of which is always repeated before returning to the beginning.

Large double-sided skin drums are characteristic of the Plains tribes, and solo end-blown flutes (flageolet) are also common.

Nettl describes the central Plains Indians, from Canada to Texas: Blackfoot, Crow, Dakota, Cheyenne, Arapaho, Kiowa, and Comanche, as the most typical and simple sub-area of the Plains-Pueblo music area. This area's music is characterized by extreme vocal tension, pulsation, melodic preference for perfect fourths and a range averring a tenth, rhythmic complexity, and increased frequency of tetratonic scales. The musics of the Arapaho and Cheyenne intensify these characteristics, while the northern tribes, especially Blackfoot music, feature simpler material, smaller melodic ranges, and fewer scale tones.

Arapaho music includes ceremonial and secular songs, such as the ritualistic Sun Dance, performed in the summer when the various bands of the Arapaho people would come together. Arapaho traditional songs consist of two sections exhibiting terraced descent, with a range greater than an octave and scales between four and six tones. Other ceremonial songs were received in visions, or taught as part of a man's initiations into a society for his age group. Secular songs include a number of social dances, such as the triple meter round dances and songs to inspire warriors or recent exploits. There are also songs said to be taught by a guardian spirit, which should be sung only when the recipient is near death.

=== Great Basin ===
Music of the Great Basin is simple, discreet and ornate, characterized by short melodies with a range smaller than an octave, moderately-blended monophony, relaxed and open vocals and, most unusually, paired-phrase structure, in which a melodic phrase, repeated twice, is alternated with one to two additional phrases. A song of this type might be diagrammed as follows: AA BB CC AA BB CC, etc.

Nettl describes the music of the sparsely settled Great Basin, including most of desert Utah and Nevada (Paiute, Ute, Shoshoni) and some of southern Oregon (Modoc and Klamath), as "extremely simple," featuring melodic ranges averaging just over a perfect fifth, many tetratonic scales, and short forms. The majority of songs are iterative with each phrase repeated once, though occasional songs with multiple repetitions are found. Many Modoc and Klamath songs contain only one repeated phrase and many of their scales only two to three notes (ditonic or tritonic). This style was carried to the Great Plains by the Ghost Dance religion which originated among the Paiute, and very frequently features paired-phrase patterns and a relaxed nonpulsating vocal style. Herzog attributes the similarly simple lullabies, song-stories, and gambling songs found all over the continent historically to the music of the Great Basin which was preserved through relative cultural isolation and low population.

=== Northwest Coast ===
Open vocals with monophony are common in the Pacific Northwest and British Columbia, though polyphony also occurs (this is the only area of North America with native polyphony). Chromatic intervals accompanying long melodies are also characteristic, and rhythms are complex and declamatory, deriving from speech. Instrumentation is more diverse than in the rest of North America, and includes a wide variety of whistles, flutes, horns and percussion instruments.

Nettl describes the music of the Kwakwaka'wakw, Nuu-chah-nulth, Tsimshian, Makah, and Quileute as some of the most complex on the continent, with the music of the Salish nations (Nlaka'pamux, Nuxálk, and Sliammon, and others directly east of the Northwest tribes) as being intermediary between these Northwest Coast tribes and Inuit music. The music of the Salish tribes, and even more so the Northwest coast, intensifies the significant features of Inuit music, see below, however their melodic movement is often pendulum-type ("leaping in broad intervals from one limit of the range to the other"). The Northwest coast music also "is among the most complicated on the continent, especially in regard to rhythmic structure," featuring intricate rhythmic patterns distinct from but related to the vocal melody and rigid percussion. He also reports unrecorded use of incipient polyphony in the form of drones or parallel intervals in addition to antiphonal and responorial forms. Vocals are extremely tense, producing dynamic contrast, ornamentation, and pulsation, and also often using multiple sudden accents in one held tone.

=== Arctic ===
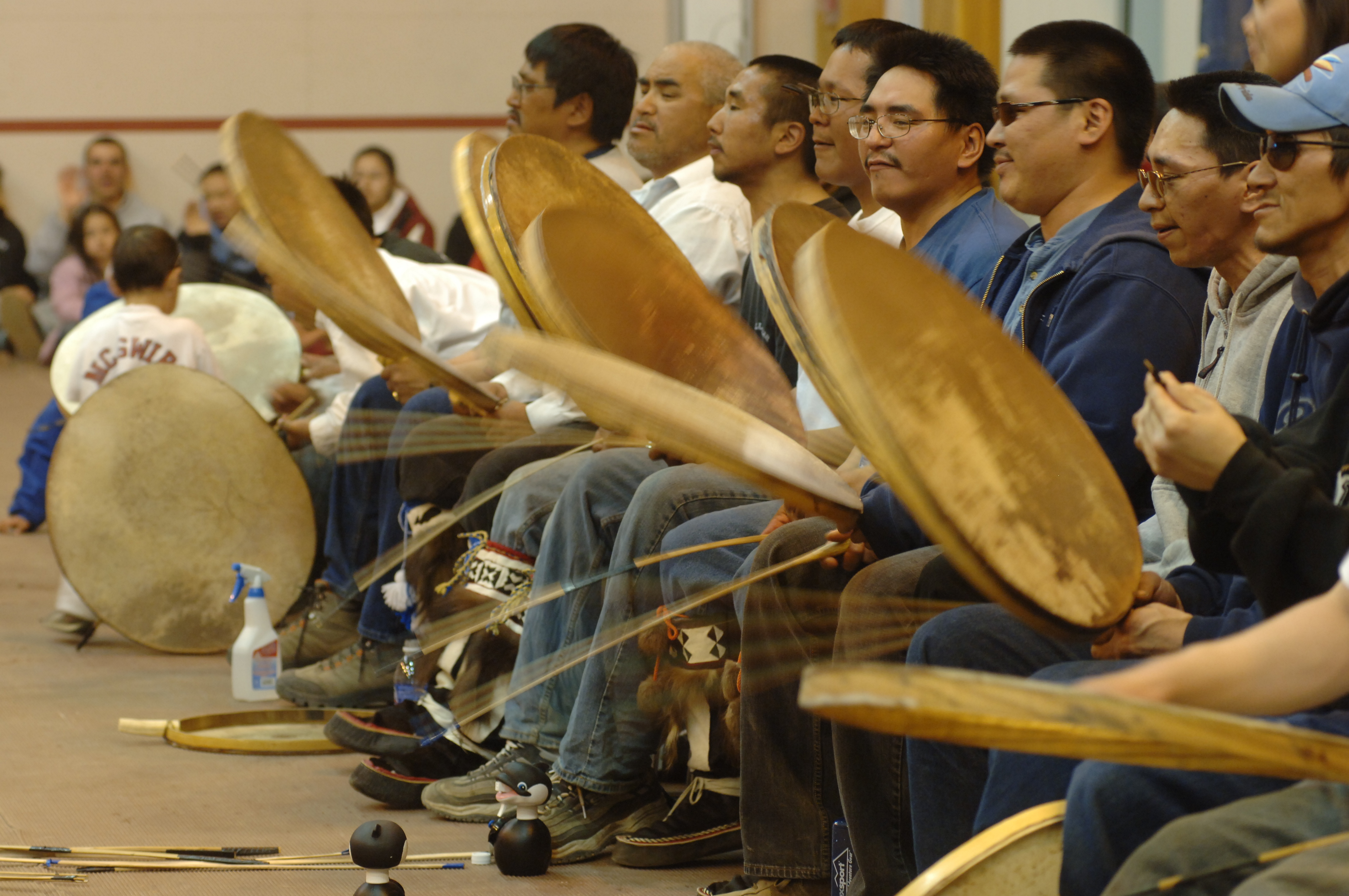
Iñupiaq drummers in Utqiaġvik, Alaska

The Inuit of Alaska, Northwest Territories, Yukon Territory, Nunavut and Greenland are well known for their throat-singing, an unusual method of vocalizing found only in a few cultures worldwide. The traditional Inuit form of throat singing usually involves two females in a face to face position, where one performer sets a rhythmic pattern with voiced or unvoiced sounds, and the other fills in the gaps of the rhythm with these sounds. These sounds are very different from that of Tuvan throat singing, which includes overtones of whistling and nasal sounds, but most prominently a low 'growling' sound. They instead produce sounds through inhalation or exhalation, most often a mixture of both in fast pace, producing an athletic musical performance. Throat-singing is used as the basis for a game among the Inuit where each performer attempts to keep up their pace and rhythm of the duet without failing. The winner of this game is the one to beat the largest number of people in these contests. Narrow-ranged melodies and declamatory effects are common, as in the Northwest. Repeated notes mark the ends of phrases. Box drums, which are found elsewhere, are common, as is a tambourine-like hand drum. In addition, the peoples of the Arctic used the bull-roarer for children's toys or for a ritual which would harden snow for easier travel. Nettl describes "Eskimo" music as some of the simplest on the continent, listing characteristics including recitative-like singing, complex rhythmic organization, relatively small melodic range averaging about a sixth, prominence of major thirds and minor seconds melodically, with undulating melodic movement.

=== Caribbean ===
Many styles of music existed amongst the indigenous people of the Caribbean islands, and the Taíno are a noteworthy example. In terms of vocals, Taíno songs typically took strophic form, where lyrics change over a constant melody for each verse. Additionally, when singing in large groups, Taíno songs often involved one vocal soloist and an entire indigenous choir singing melodic lines back and forth in a form of call and response. Additionally, like most indigenous music of North America, Taíno songs were based around the 5-pitch, pentatonic scale.

As for Taíno instrumentation, both the guiro and maracas were believed to have originated from the Taíno in modern-day Puerto Rico. The guiro is a percussion instrument made by carving shells of certain fruits and leaving parallel notch marks on the surface. It is typically played with an accompanying stick or wire fork called pua. By rubbing the pua on the carved shell, a ratchety and rasping sound is elicited and like most percussive instruments, the purpose of the guiro is providing a feeling of beat to the music. Maracas are another percussive instrument. They are made from the edible figs of the Higuera tree, which cannot be too big nor small. Once the pulp is removed from the fruit. pebbles are added to the inside of the fruit shell through two holes bored into its surface. A handle is then added to finish the crafting of the instrument. Maracas are played by shaking the tiny pebble-containing fruit husks with the handles. Another instrument includes the Fotuto, which was made via the seashells of marine species such as Charonia variegata, a species of sea snail. Indigenous Taíno blew through the small orifices located on the shells, which produced certain bass tones. Fotuto not only had its uses in musical festivities, but also acted as an effective tool for alerting Taíno fisherman of bad weather.

A prominent aspect of Taíno music is that of Areitos. Described by Spanish conquistadors as musical events ranging from rituals, celebrations, work songs, funeral observances, and drunken parties, Areito may have simply meant "group" or "activity" in the native Taíno language. Ultimately, Areitos became more than socioreligious musical events. As Spanish colonists began exploiting the Taíno and imposing Spanish culture, Areitos became a symbol of indigenous defiance and resistance. Reports exist of a Taíno female chief named Anacona, who ruled Xaragua (modern day Port-au-Prince) and led native revolts after the death of her brother at the hands of Spanish colonists. She also held Areito performances with many of her serving maidens which included songs that described the cruelty and malice of the Spanish colonists in their treatment of the Taíno as well as the blissfulness of life before the Spanish made first contact with the natives. In fact,19th century Cuban Composer Antonio Bachiller y Morales's "poem-song" is dedicated to Anacona and her heroic story. Areito dances varied widely in style with typical performances including line dances, dances that did not move more than one or two steps in either direction, and call-response styles akin to country dancing.

=== Northern Mexico ===
A primary style of indigenous music in Northern Mexico is that of the Huastec/Huaxtec indigenous group (otherwise known as Huapango style). Instruments that are emblematic of Huapango style include three-holed flutes made from sugar cane wood, small ocarinas (known as Kokowilotl), bronze bells, and a wide array of percussion instruments such as turtle shells and slit-drums known as nukup or teponaxtli.

All instruments listed above have origins that predate the arrival of any settler colonialists or foreign presence in modern-day Mexico. Many of the instruments are deeply entrenched with Huastec beliefs and culture. For example, when making a teponaxtli, Huastec belief dictates that the maker must craft the drum beside the roots of the tree that the drum's wood originated from. Additionally, the crafter must make offerings to the drum, leaving food, drinks, candles, and prayers to ensure that it maintains a good sound.

Eventually, with the arrival of Spanish colonialists into Huastec territory, Huapango style evolved into what is known as Son Huasteco, a style more indicative of the original indigenous music infused with Spanish musical forms and instruments. While African populations were present in some areas of the Huasteca region, their influence on the musical structure and instrumentation of Son Huasteco appears to have been limited and indirect, especially when compared to other Mexican regional styles such as Son Jarocho. With Spanish influence came the introduction of new instruments such as the Jarana (a smaller five-stringed guitar), Huapanguera (an eight-stringed baroque guitar), and the violin. In fact, the Son Huasteco style of violin playing is notably unique in comparison to other modern-day styles in Mexico. Songs are most often written with a 6/8 time signature (which some attribute to West-African influences), and the violinist (along with a Jarana and Huapanguera player to form a trio) has flexibility in manipulating the tempo, slowing and speeding the music as they see fit, which is very akin to a tempo rubato, although to a slightly larger degree. in fact one could say that Son Huasteco is rather improvisatory, both in speed and pitch.

Son Huasteco music frequently involves singing too. Songs are often about natural environment, elements of daily life, strong emotions, and stories. The singer will typically sing poetic verses in a strophic or verse-repeating form. Then, the singer may give the spotlight to the musicians, where a violin or Jarana may improvise for a verse or two. Then, the singer will continue singing their verses again in an A-B-A format. In some songs, the singer and instrumentalists may continue taking turns being the focus of the music, switching places until the song ends.

Most Son Huasteco music typically has a secular basis. However, there does exist indigeous styles of music in Mexico more centered around ritualistic and religious purposes. These styles are known as Son Costumbre or perhaps more simply, Son Indígena. This branch of Huastec music only involves music and dance as opposed to the key feature of singing in most Son Huasteco styles. One instance where Son Costumbre is used for rituals is for corn harvesting, an essential food sources for the Huastec region. Sets of Canarios, or small pieces, are played during important ceremonies such as weddings to pray to the gods for a successful corn harvest. These rituals are known as Tlamanes. Interestingly, the Harp is regarded in a particularly sacred position by Huastec culture, to the point where Harp music can only be played for religious ceremonies. For example, harps like the kuarsono (a 22 or 24-stringed harp) were played to pray to the gods for rain when water was scarce or for Day of the Dead celebrations (which are known as Xantolo).

== Intertribal music ==
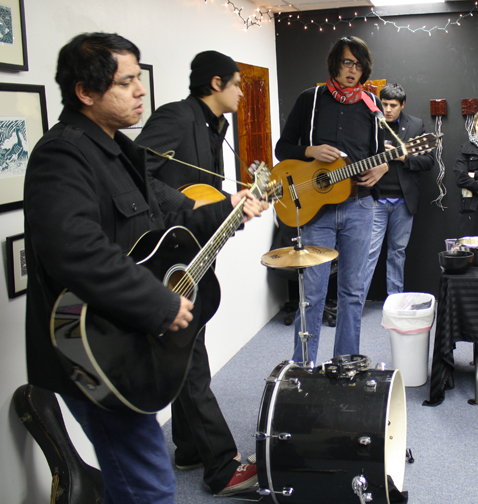
The Wake Singers, band of Oglala Lakota musicians

Many music genres span multiple tribes. Pan-tribalism is the syncretic adoption of traditions from foreign communities. Since the rise of the United States and Canada, Native Americans have forged a common identity, and invented pan-Indian music, most famously including powwows, peyote songs, and honor or victory songs.

Apache-derived peyote songs, prayers in the Native American Church, use a descending melody and monophony. Rattles and water drums are used, in a swift tempo. Ceremonial songs from the Great Plains provide the foundation for intertribal powwows, which feature music with terraced descent and nasal vocals, both Plains characteristic features.

An example of an intertribal song is the AIM Song, which uses vocables to make it accessible to people of all tribes. However, because of its origins from the Lakota and Ojibwe people, it still retains some Northern Plains and Great Lakes characteristics, called "Northern" style, as opposed to the slower "Southern" style.

John Trudell (Santee Dakota) launched a new genre of spoken word poetry in the 1980s, beginning with Aka Graffiti Man (1986). The next decade saw further innovations in Native American popular music, including Robbie Robertson (of The Band) releasing a soundtrack for a documentary, Music for the Native Americans, that saw limited mainstream success, as well as Verdell Primeaux and Johnny Mike's modernized peyote songs, which they began experimenting with on Sacred Path: Healing Songs of the Native American Church.

Waila (or chicken scratch music of the Tohono O'odham) has gained multiple musicians fame across Native American communities, while hip hop crews like WithOut Rezervation and Robby Bee & the Boyz From the Rez (Reservation of Education) have a distinctively Native American flourish to hip hop. Meanwhile, young Native musicians such as Red Earth, Derek Miller and Casper have produced more 'underground' music

American Indian opera is an intertribal music tradition, created when Gertrude Bonnin, a Yankton Dakota activist collaborated with a classical composer William Hanson to create the opera, Sun Dance in 1913. Cherokee Nation mezzo-soprano opera singer, Barbara McAlister has performed in many opera troupes and has sung at New York's Metropolitan Opera House. Brulé Lakota band Brulé and the American Indian Rock Opera create fullscale contemporary musical performances, including "Concert for Reconciliation of the Cultures."

=== Native American flute ===
A traditional Yuchi flute

The Native American flute has achieved some measure of fame for its distinctive sound, used in a variety of new age and world music recordings. Its music was used in courtship, healing, meditation, and spiritual rituals.

The late 1960s saw a roots revival centered around the flute, with a new wave of flautists and artisans like Doc Tate Nevaquaya (Comanche) and Carl Running Deer. Notable and award-winning Native American flautists include: Mary Youngblood, Kevin Locke, Charles Littleleaf, Jay Red Eagle, Robert Tree Cody, Robert Mirabal, Joseph Firecrow, and Jeff Ball. Tommy Wildcat is a contemporary flautist, who makes traditional Cherokee river cane flutes. Of special importance is R. Carlos Nakai (Changes, 1983), who has achieved Gold record status and mainstream credibility for his mixture of the flute with other contemporary genres.

The Native American flute is the only flute in the world constructed with two air chambers – there is a wall inside the flute between the top (slow) air chamber and the bottom chamber which has the whistle and finger holes. The top chamber also serves as a secondary resonator, which gives the flute its distinctive sound. There is a hole at the bottom of the "slow" air chamber and a (generally) square hole at the top of the playing chamber. A block (or "bird") with a spacer is tied on top of the flute to form a thin, flat airstream for the whistle hole (or "window"). Some more modern flutes use an undercut either in the block or the flute to eliminate the need for a spacer.

The "traditional" Native American flute was constructed using measurements based on the body – the length of the flute would be the distance from armpit to wrist, the length of the top air chamber would be one fist-width, the distance from the whistle to the first hole also a fist-width, the distance between holes would be one thumb-width, and the distance from the last hole to the end would generally be one fist-width. Unlike Western music, traditional American Indian music had no standard pitch reference such as A440, so flutes were not standardized for pitch.

Historic Native American flutes are generally tuned to a variation of the minor pentatonic scale (such as you would get playing the black keys on a piano), which gives the instrument its distinctive plaintive sound. Recently some makers have begun experimenting with different scales, giving players new melodic options. Also, modern flutes are generally tuned in concert keys (such as A or D) so that they can be easily played with other instruments. The root keys of modern Native American flutes span a range of about three and a half octaves, from C2 to A5.

Native American flutes most commonly have either 5 or 6 holes, but instruments can have anything from no holes to seven (including a thumb hole). Various makers employ different scales and fingerings for their flutes.

Some modern Native American flutes are called "drone" flutes, and are two (or more) flutes built together. Generally, the drone chamber plays a fixed note which the other flute can play against in harmony.

=== Drums ===
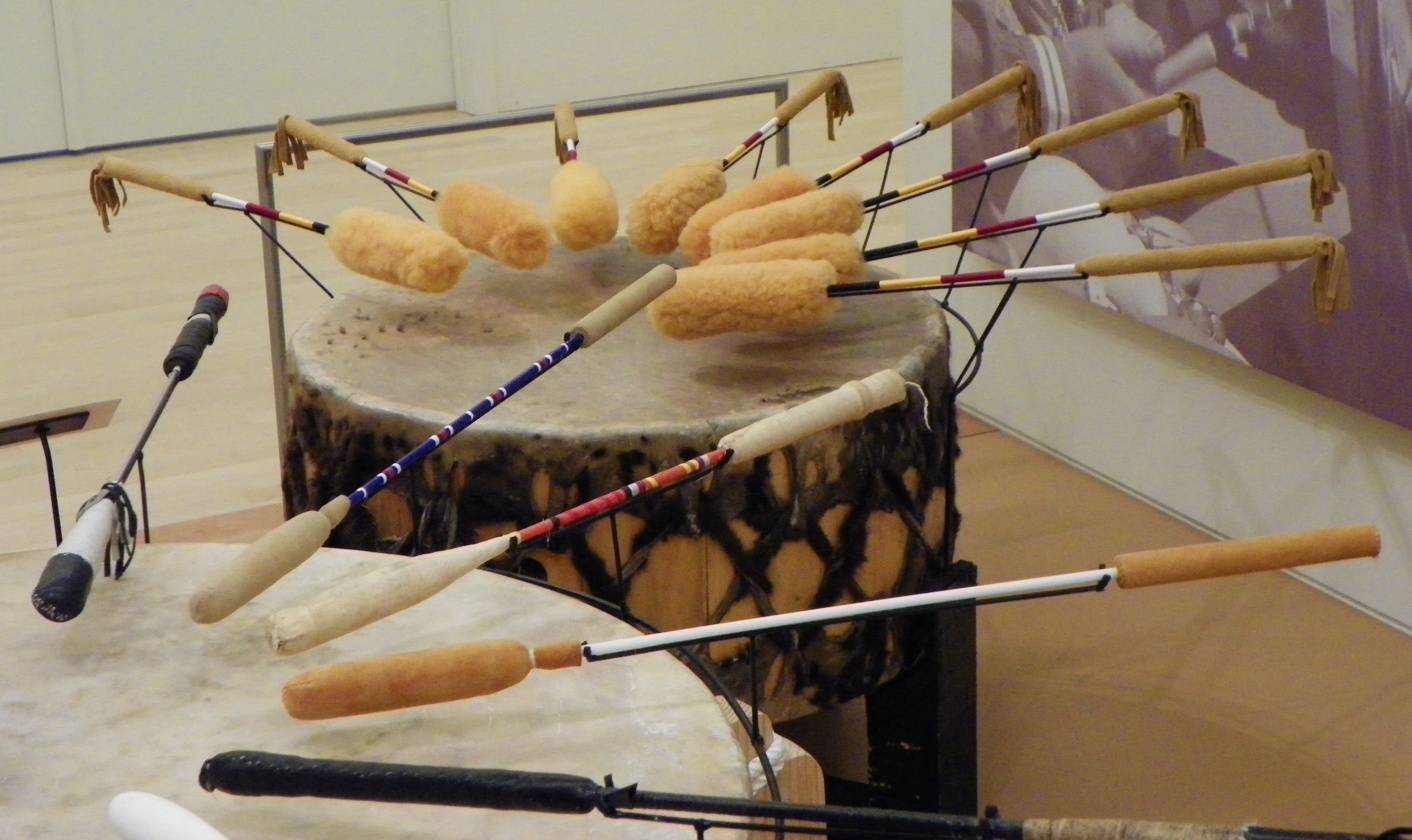
Drum and drumsticks at rest

Drums are highly influential in American Indian music. Different tribes have different traditions about their drums and how to play them. For larger dance or powwow type drums, the basic construction is very similar in most tribes: a wooden frame or a carved and hollowed-out log, with rawhide buckskin or elk skin stretched out across the opening by sinew thongs. Traditionally American Indian drums are large, two to three feet in diameter, and they are played communally by groups of singers who sit around them in a circle. For smaller single-sided hand drums, a thinner frame or shell is used, and a rawhide surface is strung onto only one side, with lacing across the other. Other types include two basic styles of water drums: the Iroquois type and the Yaqui type. The Iroquois water drum is a small cup-shaped wooden vessel, with water inside it, and a moistened tanned hide stretched across the top opening; the wetness and tightness of the tanned hide produce changes in pitch as the water drum is played over time. The Yaqui type of water drum is actually a half gourd, large in size, that floats in a tub of water like a bubble on the surface; the outer round surface of the gourd is struck with a drum stick, and the vibrations are amplified using the tub of water as a resonator.

Another type of drum called a foot drum have been found in several southwestern and central-Californian Native American archaeological sites inhabited, or formally inhabited, by the Miwok, Maidu, Nahua, and Hopi Indian tribes. These drums were often semicircle cross-sectioned hollow logs laid over wood covered 'resonating' pits positioned according to custom in kivas or dance houses. The foot drums were played by stomping on top of the hollow log with the structure's poles used for steadying.

=== Awards ===
The dedicated Native American Music Awards, which successfully proposed the Grammy Award for Best Native American Music Album, was launched in 1998 and continues to be held annually. The Native American Music Awards or N.A.M.A. was the first national awards program for Native American music in North America. The awards were born out of a need for greater recognition for Native American music initiatives and remains the largest professional membership based organization in the world.

From 2001 to 2011, the American Grammy Awards presented an annual award for Best Native American Music Album, and the Canadian Juno Awards present an annual award for Aboriginal Recording of the Year. On April 6, 2011, it was announced that the Grammy Award for Best Native American Music Album would be merged with the Best Hawaiian Music Album and Best Zydeco or Cajun Music Album categories into a new category, Best Regional Roots Music Album. This change was part of a massive restructuring of Grammy categories.

== Samples ==
- Media:Bice'waan Song.ogg is a recording from the Library of Congress, collected by Alice Cunningham Fletcher and Francis La Flesche and published in 1897. The singer is George Miller, who was probably born in about 1852. It was described as: "The true love-song, called by the Omaha Bethae waan, an old designation and not a descriptive name, is sung generally in the early morning, when the lover is keeping his tryst and watching for the maiden to emerge from the tent and go to the spring. They belong to the secret courtship and are sometimes called Me-the-g'thun wa-an – courting songs. . . . They were sung without drum, bell or rattle, to accent the rhythm, in which these songs is subordinated to tonality and is felt only in the musical phrases. . . . Vibrations for the purpose of giving greater expression were not only affected by the tremolo of the voice, but they were enhanced by waving the hand, or a spray of artemesia before the lips, while the body often swayed gently to the rhythm of the song (Fletcher, 1894, p. 156)."
- Download recording Ghost Dance and gambling song from the Paiute and Arapaho Native Americans from the Library of Congress' Emile Berliner and the Birth of the Recording Industry Collection; performed by James Mooney (possibly along with Charles Mooney; neither are believed to be Native Americans) on July 5, 1894

== See also ==
- Indian House
- The Ballad of Ira Hayes
- Indigenous metal music
- Native American hip hop
