= Indian House =

Indian House is a Taos, New Mexico based record company specialized in traditional Native American Indian music in the United States and Canada. Founded in 1966 by Tony and Ida Lujan Isaacs, the Indian House catalog has now around 150 titles. The company originally issued recordings on phonodisc and cassette tape.

== Notable recordings ==
- Round Dance -It was recorded in two volumes on November 12, 1966, at Taos Pueblo.
- War Dance -Recorded on May 15, 1967, is a Southern Ponca Hethushka (or War Dance) performed at Ponca City, Oklahoma.
- Navajo Sway -It was recorded in two volumes and comprises 41 songs.
- Night & Daylight Yeibichei -It was sung by Navaho singers from Klagetoh, Arizona and Boniface Bonnie.
- Navajo Skip Dance and Two-Step -
- Comanche Peyote -
- Zuni Fair -It was recorded live at Zuni McKinley county fair, in New Mexico on 27–29 August 1971.
- ''Kiowa Gourd Dance -It was recorded in two volumes which comprises 23 songs at Carnegie, Oklahoma on 10 June 1974.
- Cheyenne Peyote -
- Sounds of the Badland Singers -
- Navajo Corn Grinding & Shoe Game Songs -
- The Klagetoh Swingers – Navajo Songs About Love -It was recorded at Klagetoh, Arizona in 1974 which comprises 26 songs in two volumes.
- War Dance Songs of the Kiowa -It contains 38 songs in two volumes.
- Flute Songs of the Kiowa and Comanche -
- Klagetoh Maiden Singers -It was recorded in 1977, and comprises 24 songs.
- Kiowa Church Songs -It was recorded in two volumes at Carnegie, Oklahoma on 31 March 1971. First volume contains 22 songs and second, 18.
- Yankton Sioux Peyote -It was recorded at Lake Andes, South Dakota on 6 July 1976 and consists of 88 songs in four volumes.
- Turtle Dance Songs of San Juan Pueblo -The album represents the Turtle dance performed annually on 26 December at San Juan Pueblo and consists songs composed during 1971 turtle dance and was recorded around a month later the public performances.
- Cloud Dance Songs of San Juan Pueblo -The album represents Cloud dance performed alternate a year in San Juan Pueblo on 26 December and comprises six songs of 1972 Cloud dance that was recorded around a month later the public performances.
