= Shí naashá =

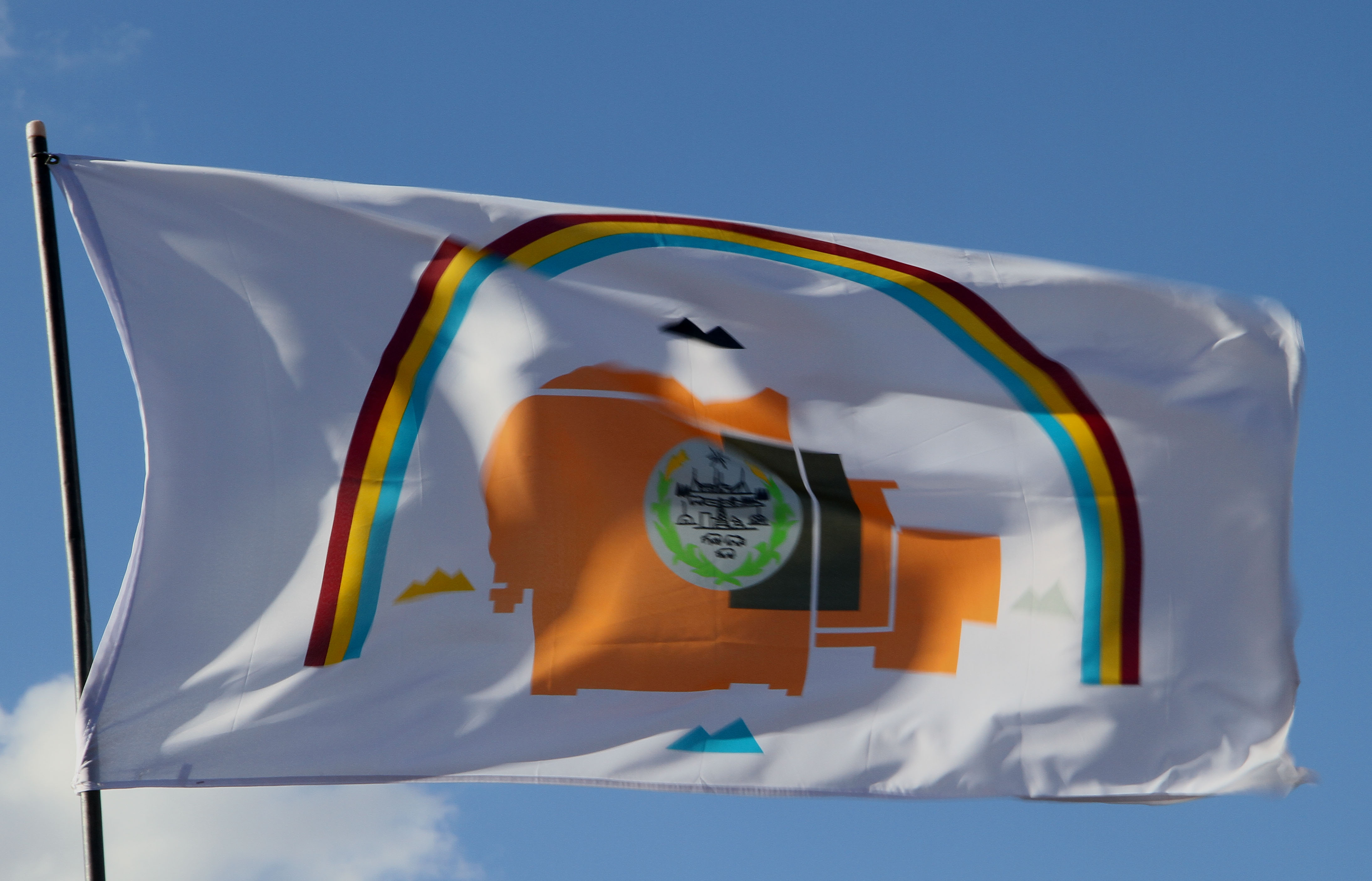
- Flag of the Navajo Nation

Song
- Language: Navajo
- Written: 1868

Shí naashá (I'm going) is a Navajo song, composed in 1868 to commemorate the release of the Navajo from internment at Fort Sumner. The song's lyrics express the elation of the Navajo people on the occasion of their return to their homeland.

The word hózhǫ́ (beauty), a major concept in Navajo spirituality, is used throughout the song.

== Lyrics ==
Ahala ahalago naashá ghą
Shí naashá ghą, shí naashá ghą,
Shí naashá lágo hózhǫ’ la.
Shí naashá ghą, shí naashá ghą,
Shí naashá, ladee hózhǫ’ǫ’ lá.

Translation:

I am going in freedom
I am going, I am going,
I am going in beauty.
I am going, I am going,
I am going, beauty is all around me.
