= Incomplete repetition =

Musical form

Incomplete repetition is a musical form featuring two large sections, the second being a partial or incomplete re-presentation or repetition of the first.

This form is used throughout the traditional Plains-Pueblo Native American music where the first section uses vocables and the second uses meaningful words or lyrics. Typical formal schemes include ABC, BC, AABC, and ABC and each section uses a tile type melodic contour.

Examples of AABC form include Tadd Dameron's "Lady Bird".
