= Indigenous metal music =

Music genre

Indigenous metal
- Stylistic origins: Thrash metal; extreme metal; death metal; heavy metal
- Cultural origins: Early 1990s
- Typical instruments: Electric guitar; bass guitar; drums; vocals; percussion

Fusion genres
- Indigenous music of North America; Blackened thrash metal; death metal; extreme metal; groove metal; folk metal

Other topics
- Indigenous music; indigenous peoples

Indigenous metal is heavy metal music played by indigenous peoples of various colonized regions. Bands may play music from across the metal spectrum, though most center indigenous themes, stories, or instruments. Groups with indigenous members are sometimes considered to play indigenous metal regardless of the thematic content of their music.

Indigenous metal entered American popular culture in the 1980s and early 1990s through the commercial success of songs like "Indians" by Anthrax. Several Native-fronted bands, such as thrash metal group Testament, also began releasing music dealing with indigenous themes during this period. Brazilian band Sepultura helped pioneer the style through the 1996 release of Roots, which was created in collaboration with members of a Xavante community and is noted for its distinct Brazilian percussion, ambient field noise, and chanting. A Karajá man features on the cover of the album.

"True" native metal (heavy metal created by Native American artists who use traditional instruments and language) gained popularity throughout the 2000s, especially in parts of Arizona, New Mexico, and Texas, where it is more commonly known as rez metal, short for "reservation metal".

== Characteristics ==
=== Themes and lyrics ===
The term "indigenous metal" is sometimes conflated with "tribal metal," which is more broadly influenced by pan-indigenous stories and follows Viking metal bands' approach to capturing their culture. Indigenous metal is often explicitly defined as exploring themes of "experienced dispossession, liberation, and death" in addition to preserving linguistic and cultural heritage. Native American metal bands in the Southwest United States sometimes refer to their musical style as "Rez metal," as it concerns political issues that make it popular among youth on reservations.

Many bands focus on linguistic preservation by singing either partially or exclusively in their indigenous languages. Notably, New Zealand band Alien Weaponry have performed several songs in the Māori language on international stages. Bands Aborigene and Araña, who write about Maya civilization and Pipil stories, are among the most popular metal acts from El Salvador.

=== Musical style ===
Artists may make use of cultural imagery, fashion, melodies, and instrumentation. In general, the use of percussion and traditional wind instruments are a core compositional element to indigenous metal music. Mexican band Cemican, for example, incorporate pre-colonial Aztec wind instruments such as stone flutes in their songs.

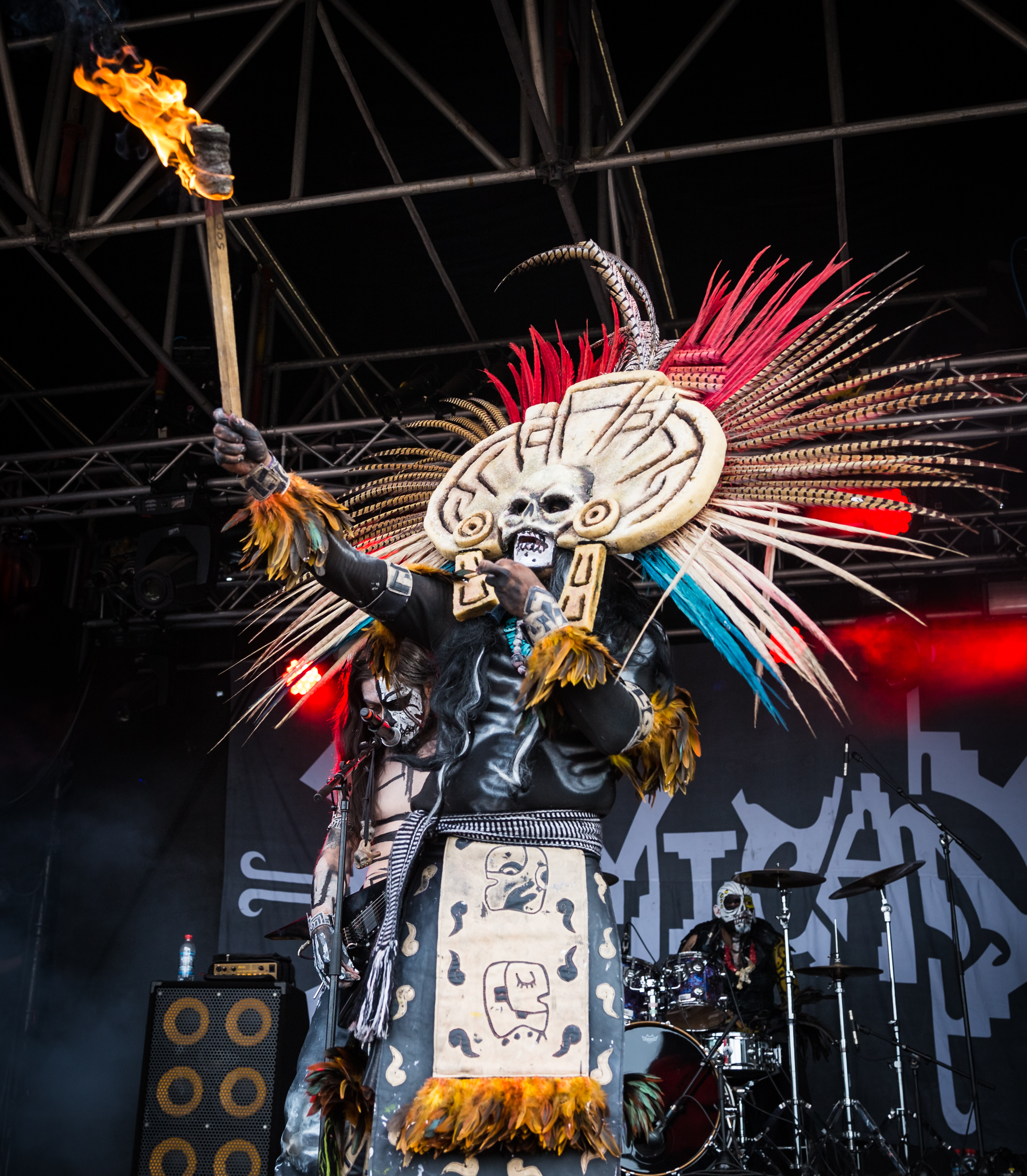
Joseph "Tecuhtli" Hermnant of band Cemican onstage at Wacken Open Air

== Language revitalization ==
Metal that showcases indigenous languages plays an important role in revitalization efforts, especially when the languages used are endangered. In an interview, Alien Weaponry manager Niel de Jong voiced his belief that making the Māori language "...cool through music" may convince apprehensive Māori youth to learn the language. Brazilian folk metal band Arandu Arakuaa regularly perform in Tupi Guarani, Xerénte, and Xavante; they include a children's song on every album to promote the languages to young audiences. In 2013, Testament lead singer Chuck Billy, who is Pomo and spent much of his youth on the Hopland Band reservation, was recognized by both California State Assembly member Jim Frasier and the National Museum of the American Indian for his positive contributions to Native American image.

Some bands have faced backlash within their communities for unconventional language use. For example, Igloolik-based Inuit band Northern Haze were initially discouraged from writing lyrics in their native Inuktitut when they began releasing music in the 1980s.

== Controversy ==
Indigenous metal is often criticized for not being "true" Indigenous music. This trend is pervasive with respect to Indigenous knowledge production and Indigenous arts and has been criticized by Indigenous people as colonial in nature, one that solidifies the stereotype of Indigenous peoples as fundamentally "backward". The idea of a complete loss of culture also fails to take into consideration the continuance of traditions changing in different mediums, such as but not limited to the use of black metal corpse paint which, while it originates in black metal, is also similar to the look of the Navajo witches.

== Further research ==
=== Academic ===
- Garcia, Marcelo Velloso; Gama, Vítor Castelões (1 March 2020). "Brazilian native metal and the experience of transculturation". Metal Music Studies. 7 (1). The International Society for Metal Music Studies: 171–177. doi:10.1386/mms_00041_1. ISSN 2052-3998.

=== Press ===
- Goldstein, Steve (December 24, 2020) [December 23, 2020]. "'Rez Metal': Behind the Popularity of Heavy Metal on the Navajo Nation" (online). Fronteras.
- Fossberg, Harald (April 1, 2023) [March 29, 2023]. "Mutilated Tyrant: a conversation about the Navajo black metal scene". Inferno Music Conference. Inferno Metal Festival.
- Lewry, Fraser (September 18, 2023). ""It gives you a sense of pride. That's your language you're singing." Meet Shepherds Reign, the fearless Samoan band putting Polynesian metal on the map". Metal Hammer.

=== Audiovisual media ===
- Clarke Tolton (director) (December 2018). Metal From the Dirt: Inside the Navajo Reservation's DIY Heavy-Metal Scene. YouTube. Revolver Magazine.
- Kelvin. "Rez Metal Podcast" (Podcast).

=== General background ===
- Gardiner, Susannah (April 25, 2022). "Who Gets to Define Native American Art?". Smithsonian Magazine.
