= Pueblo music =

Music of the Puebloan peoples

Pueblo music includes the music of the Hopi, Zuni, Taos Pueblo, San Ildefonso, Santo Domingo, and many other Puebloan peoples, and according to Bruno Nettl features one of the most complex Native American musical styles on the continent. Characteristics include common use of hexatonic and heptatonic scales, variety of form, melodic contour, and percussive accompaniment, melodic range averaging between an octave and a twelfth, with rhythmic complexity equal to the Plains Indians musical sub-area.

Nettl cites the Kachina dance songs as the most complex songs and the music of Hopi and Zuni as the most complex of the Pueblo, while Tanoan and Keresan music is simpler and intermediate between the Plains and western Pueblos. The music of the Pima and Papago is intermediary between the Plains-Pueblo and the California-Yuman music areas, with melodic movement of the Yuman, though including the rise, and the form and rhythm of the Pueblo. (Nettl 1956, p. 112-113)

Work songs are found in Pueblo music, but are otherwise mostly unknown among Native American folk music (Nettl, 1965, p. 152). One well-known melody from the Zuni people is Zuni Sunrise or The Sunrise Call, a song frequently played on Native American flute. This melody was initially collected by Carlos Troyer and published in an arrangement for voice and piano in 1904.

Peyote songs share characteristics of Apache music and Plains-Pueblo music.

== Sources ==
- Nettl, Bruno (1956). Music in Primitive Culture. Harvard University Press.
- Nettl, Bruno (1965). Folk and Traditional Music of the Western Continents. Prentice-Hall, Inc.
