= Peyote song =

Native American Church religious music

Peyote songs are a form of Native American music, now most often performed as part of services in the Native American Church. They are typically accompanied by a rattle and water drum, and are used in a ceremonial aspect during the sacramental taking of peyote.

== History ==
Peyote songs began with the blend of the Ute music style with Navajo singing. Ed Tiendle Yeahquo composed over 120 peyote songs, many are still sung in NAC today. Vocal style, melodic contour, and rhythm in Peyote songs is closer to Apache than Plains, featuring only two durational values, predominating thirds and fifths of Apache music with the tile-type melodic contour, incomplete repetitions, and isorhythmic tendencies of Plains-Pueblo music. The cadential formula use is also probably of Apache origin.

In recent years, modernized peyote songs have been popularized by Verdell Primeaux, a Sioux, and Johnny Mike, a Navajo. Jim Pepper, who came from a Kaw and Creek family, used a peyote song he learned from his grandfather as the basis for the 1969 popular song "Witchi Tai To", which has since gone on to become a jazz and pop standard.

== Usage ==
Peyote music is often associated with the consumption of peyote cactus. Its consumption can be used in religious sacrament among North American native peoples.

Peyote music is largely associated with healing rituals as well as major life events in the peyote community.

== See also ==
- Native American Church is a Native American religious movement characterized by mixed traditional and Christian beliefs and by sacramental use of the entheogen peyote.
