= Water drum =

Percussion instrument

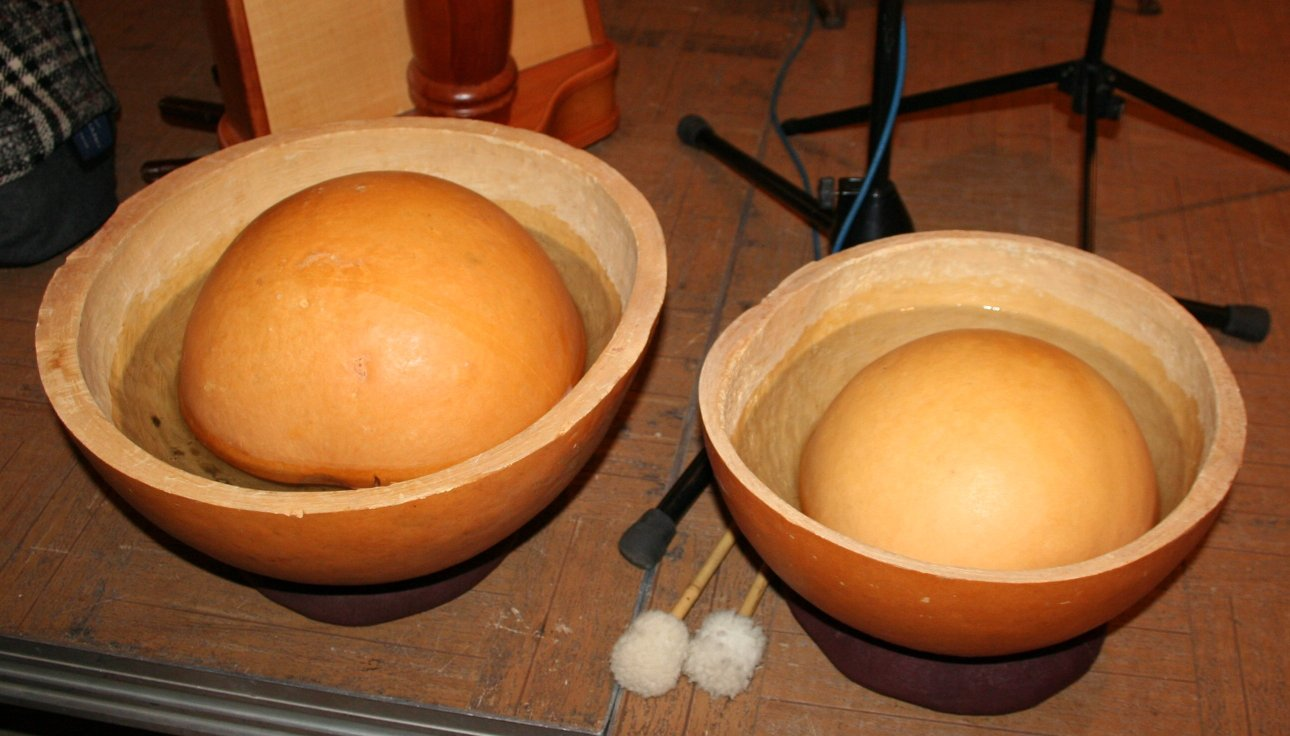
Two water drums

Water drums are a category of membranophone characterized by the filling of the drum chamber with some amount of water to create a unique resonant sound. Water drums are used all over the world, but are found most prominently in a ceremonial as well as social role in the Indigenous music of North America, as well as in African music. The drums are most often made from a pot of clay, ceramic, wood or metal, with a small amount of liquid inside and topped with drum head consisting of a stretched membrane, usually of some type of animal hide.

Water drumming, the tambor de agua (Spanish: drum of water), bungo, or liquindi, of African origin, is water, such as a river, which is played by striking the surface directly with one's hands. It is performed by the Baka in Africa, and in South America by the descendants of formerly enslaved people, with strokes comparable to the culoepuya.

== Construction ==
Historically, water drums have most often been made with a body of wood or clay, with a skin drum head. Wooden water drums are made by either hollowing out a solid section of a small soft wood log, or assembled using cedar slats and banded like a wooden keg. Clay drums are either handmade for this purpose, or an old crock is used. Wyandot, Seneca, and Cayuga people traditionally use groundhog skin (daˀyęh) for the drum head, though deer skin is also sometimes used. An Iroquoian or Wendat/Wyandot drum stick is carved from a piece of hardwood with a small rounded tip. The tone of the drum changes based on the amount of water in the vessel, as well as how tight or loose the head is.

Modern Native American Church ceremonies often use a water drum made from iron, brass or copper kettle. These styles of water drum are now more common than the traditional woodland forms. The distinctive sound of the drum characteristic of the Native American Church is created because: "The water inside is in constant motion and produces a special resonance. The player's thumb, pressed against the drum head, holds the tone at a constant pitch which then drops a fifth or more when the pressure is relaxed between songs."

== Use ==
=== Native American ===
Water drums are common in Native American music, and are used ceremonially among Indigenous peoples of both North and South America.

==== North America ====
In North America, Iroquois, Navajo, Cherokee, Muscogee, and Apache peoples use water drums in music, and they are used both ceremonially and in traditional Longhouse social dances among the Huron/Wendat/Wyandot and Iroquois/Haudenosaune peoples. The Ojibwa, Odawa and Pottawatomii traditionally call the drums midegwakikoon, with "Mide" referring to the Midewiwin medicine societies. Water drums are used in Yaqui deer dance music, representing the deer's heartbeat.

==== South America ====
In South America, the cataquí is a water drum used by the Toba (aka Qom), Wichí, Pilagá, Chorote and Nivaclé cultures in the South American Gran Chaco region. The cataquí is made from a hollowed out tree trunk or ceramic pot, into which water is poured. The mouth is closed with a leather skin, made from corzuela hide (Red brocket deer skin), which is hit with a single stick. The cataquí has been used in ceremonies, including the carob, and has also been used in calling songs at dances, for couples to form.

=== Africa ===
In Central Africa, water drums are the major component of Baka music. In some areas of the Congo and Cameroon its use is reserved for women, specifically women hunters, and used in the ceremonies they hold before they go on hunts.

In Tuareg music, the askalabo is a calabash "partly submerged in water, drummed to mimic camels' hooves".

== Pop culture ==
Since approximately 2006, the American heavy metal band, Mushroomhead have used nontraditional water drums in their live shows - mainly for visual purposes.

== See also ==
- Hydraulophone
- Jal tarang
- Ocean drum
