= Snake dance =

American school homecoming tradition

A snake dance is a parade before or during a high-school event such as a football game. The parade includes floats built by each class, marching bands, students, and alumni.

The term may be used more narrowly to describe a student parade, a line of students celebrating, or a parade starting in a central business district or school location and ending with an evening bonfire and pep rally near the school. The University of Northern Iowa archives refer to a snake dance as early as 1922. A 1911 Associated Press dispatch covering Philadelphia fans celebrating the Philadelphia Athletics victory in Game 2 of the 1911 World Series reported, "Staid business and professional men joined their office boys and ragged urchins in a snake dance around city hall".
