= Bruno Nettl =

American ethnomusicologist (1930–2020)

- Nettl before 2014
- Born: March 14, 1930; Prague, Czechoslovakia
- Died: January 15, 2020 (aged 89); Urbana, Illinois, US
- Known for: Scholarship on music of the Blackfoot people, Iran, Southern India and ethnomusicology as a discipline

Academic background
- Education: Indiana University Bloomington; University of Michigan
- Thesis: American Indian Music North of Mexico: Its Styles and Areas (1953)
- Doctoral advisor: George Herzog

Academic work
- Discipline: Ethnomusicology
- Institutions: University of Illinois Urbana-Champaign
- Website: brunonettl.com

Bruno Nettl (March 14, 1930 – January 15, 2020) was an American ethnomusicologist and academic of Czech birth. A central figure of ethnomusicology, he was among the discipline's most influential scholars. Nettl's research interests varied widely; he wrote on music of the Blackfoot people, Iran, Southern India and particularly the scope and methods of ethnomusicology as a discipline. His lengthy teaching-career centered on the University of Illinois Urbana-Champaign, where his many students included Stephen Blum and Philip V. Bohlman.

== Early life and education ==
Bruno Nettl was born on March 14, 1930 in Prague, then in Czechoslovakia, to a musical family. His father was Paul Nettl (1889–1972), a well-known musicologist who researched Mozart as well as the connections between Czech, German and Jewish musical traditions. Among the elder Nettl's work was the Handbuch der Musikgeschichte (1930) with Guido Adler, and the Beethoven Encyclopedia (1956). His mother, Gertrude (née Hutter) Nettl (1905–1952), was both a pianist and piano teacher. Bruno played violin in his youth, at one point in an orchestra under Kurt Weill. He also studied piano and took part in Dalcroze eurhythmics classes taught by his mother. Two childhood events galvanized an early interest in the study of music: at age six he heard his father's student discuss his upcoming trip to India, saying "much of the music [there is] improvised"; later that year, his father captivated him with the Musiques de Oriente anthology compiled by Erich von Hornbostel, including music from across Asia.

The Nettl family, of Jewish descent, fled Europe in 1939 amid Nazi Germany's occupation of Czechoslovakia. Nettl and his parents settled in the Princeton, New Jersey, US, while other family members fled worldwide; numerous Nettl relatives died during the Holocaust. His father taught at Princeton's Westminster Choir College, and the family became American citizens in 1945. After attending high school in Princeton, the family moved to Bloomington, Indiana, where Nettl attended the Indiana University Bloomington (IU). From IU he would receive a Bachelor of Arts (1950), Master of Arts (1951) and PhD (1953), all in musicology. For the latter PhD, he wrote a dissertation on the music of the Blackfeet people, under the advisement of George Herzog. This dissertation "marked the first ever doctorate in the nascent field of ethnomusicology". He later received a second Masters in library science from University of Michigan.

== Career ==
=== Institutions and organizations ===
External videos
- Lecture by Nettl for the Charles Homer Haskins Prize
- A Life of Learning

Nettl's career centered around the University of Illinois Urbana-Champaign (UIUC), where he founded an ethnomusicology department and taught from 1964 to 2011. He was gradually appointed higher positions at UIUC: Associate Professor of Music in 1964, Professor of Music and Anthropology in 1967, and Professor Emeritus of Music and Anthropology in 1992. Nettl rose UIUC's ethnomusicology department to national eminence, with 6 full-time professors. His own course teachings included topics on folk music, improvisation, world music and the musics of the Czech Republic, Native Americans, and the Middle East. Although Nettl retired in 1992, he continued part-time teaching until 2011.

President of the Society for Ethnomusicology from 1969 to 1971, he held honorary doctorates from the University of Illinois, Carleton College, Kenyon College, and the University of Chicago. He was a recipient of the Fumio Koizumi Prize for ethnomusicology, and was a fellow of the American Academy of Arts and Sciences. The Sousa Archives and Center for American Music holds the Bruno Nettl Papers (1966–1988), which consists of administrative and personal correspondence while Nettl was a professor and head of the Musicology Division for the University of Illinois School of Music. Nettl received the first Taichi Traditional Music Award in 2012 from the China Conservatory of Music, and was named the 2014 Charles Homer Haskins Prize Lecturer by the American Council of Learned Societies.

=== Scholarship ===
Active principally in the field of ethnomusicology, Nettl's scholarship covered many diverse musical traditions throughout the world. The musicologist Patricia Shehan Campbell described him as "probably the field's most prolific writer". By the reckoning of ethnomusicologist David McDonald, Nettl's œuvre included at least 36 books and 137 articles. His research ranged from the music of Iran to music of South India and the music of Central Europe to the traditions of North America, particularly the music of the Native Americans. Other interests include folk music, improvisation in general, Slavic music urban musical cultures and the history and definition of ethnomusicology as a discipline. Nettl himself cited Blackfeet, Iranian, and Southern Indian music as his fields of expertise, having done fieldwork with all three cultures. He authored the article on music for The New Grove Dictionary of Music and Musicians.

Native American music was the focus of Nettl's early career, a typical subject for American ethnomusicologists of the mid-20th century. He did field research in Montana on the Blackfeet people's music for his 1953 PhD dissertation; It was republished in 1954. Nettl applied the Kulturkreis anthropological theory to the topic, but later reflected on its faults: "The idea was: each tribe had one musical style, and I would ignore other kinds of music in their repertory. No one cares much about this style of analysis now, but several people did follow up on my example and [...] I don't think it works". Over three decades later Nettl published Blackfoot Musical Thought: Comparative Perspectives (1989).

Nettl's research included the music of the Middle East, particularly that of Iran/Persia. He lived in the capital Tehran during the late 1960s and early 1970s, working alongside performers of Persian traditional music. This led to a 1972 monograph on the performance practice of Persian music, co-authored with Béla Foltin. For half a year, Nettl also did fieldwork in what is now Chennai, southern India.

McDonald remarked that Nettl's "most important research contributions, however, involved historicizing the discipline [of ethnomusicology] from its early origins to the present day." Nettl's The Study of Ethnomusicology: Twenty-Nine Issues and Concepts (1983), later revised to Thirty-One Issues and Concepts (2005), is "considered a classic in the field". He authored other surveys, such as the Theory and Method in Ethnomusicology (1964) and edited Comparative Musicology and Anthropology of Music (1991), alongside his student Philip V. Bohlman. From 1961–1965 and 1998–2002, Nettl edited the Ethnomusicology journal, also serving on an AMS advisory board for both American music publications, and the Garland Encyclopedia of World Music, as well as advising for the Detroit Monographs in Musicology and Chicago Studies in Ethnomusicology.

== Legacy ==
Nettl was a central figure in ethnomusicology. Musicologist Jeffrey Sposato, a colleague of Nettl, remarked that "to describe Bruno as a giant in the field of ethnomusicology hardly does him justice. His work was seminal in establishing the discipline in the United States, both through his research and via the army of ethnomusicologists he has trained over the years". Several of Nettl's students became important music scholars, Samuel Araujo, Carol Babiracki, Gérard Béhague, Virginia Danielson, Victoria Lindsay Levine, Ali Jihad Racy, Melinda Russell, Margaret Sarkissian, Stephen Slawek, Ted Solis, Christopher Waterman, and notably, Stephen Blum and Philip V. Bohlman.

Michael Beckerman concluded that "Partially as a result of Bruno's influence, Ethnomusicology has always been among the least pretentious fields in the humanities and social sciences, because after all, if one of the founders and leaders of the field is more interested in what is being studied than how he appears studying it, such a thing filters down to younger scholars".

== Personal life ==
Nettl met his wife, the artist Wanda Maria White, while he was a student at Indiana University and the couple married in 1952. The couple founded an annual ethnomusicology lecture series aimed at a "general academic audience" in 2000: The Bruno and Wanda Nettl Distinguished Lecture in Ethnomusicology. They had two children, Rebecca and Gloria. His daughters continued living in Champaign in their adulthood.

Outside of music, Nettl enjoyed spending time with family, attending concerts, playing casual poker, baking and solving The New York Times crossword. He frequently wrote comedic verses for close friends and family; they were collected and published in the anthology Perverse at Eighty (2010), which included drawings by his daughter Gloria. He continued to publish prolifically until his death on January 15, 2020 in Urbana, Illinois, US.

== Selected writings ==
Books

- Nettl, Bruno (1953). American Indian Music North of Mexico: Its Styles and Areas (Thesis). Bloomington: Indiana University Bloomington.
  - —— (1954). North American Indian Musical Styles. Philadelphia: American Folklore Society. OCLC 376606.
- —— (1956). Music in Primitive Culture. Cambridge: Harvard University Press.
- —— (1960). Cheremis Musical Styles. Bloomington: Indiana University Press.
- —— (1964). Theory and Method in Ethnomusicology. Glencoe: The Free Press of Glencoe.
- —— (1965). Folk and Traditional Music of the Western Continents. Hoboken: Prentice-Hall. ISBN 0-13-323247-6.
  - —— (1989). Folk and Traditional Music of the Western Continents. Hoboken: Prentice-Hall.
- —— (1976). Folk Music In The U.S. An Introduction. Detroit: Wayne State University Press.
- ——; Foltin, Béla (1977). Daramad of Chahargah: A Study in the Performance Practice of Persian Music. Detroit: Information Coordinators.
- —— (1978). Eight Urban Musical Cultures. Champaign: University of Illinois Press.
- —— (1989). Blackfoot Musical Thought: Comparative Perspectives. Kent: Kent State University Press. ISBN 0-87338-370-2.
- —— (1983). The Study of Ethnomusicology: Twenty-Nine Issues and Concepts. Champaign: University of Illinois Press. ISBN 0-252-03033-8.
  - —— (2005). The Study of Ethnomusicology: Thirty-One Issues and Concepts (2 ed.). Champaign: University of Illinois Press. ISBN 978-0-252-03033-8. OCLC 59879505.
  - —— (2015). The Study of Ethnomusicology: Thirty-Three discussions (2 ed.). Champaign: University of Illinois Press. ISBN 978-0-252-03928-7. OCLC 960342953.
- —— (1991). Comparative Musicology And Anthropology Of Music. Chicago: University of Chicago Press.
- —— (1995). Heartland Excursions. Champaign: University of Illinois Press. ISBN 0-252-02135-5.
- —— (1995). Music, Culture, & Experience. Chicago: University of Chicago Press.
- —— (1996). Excursions In World Music. Kent: Prentice Hall.
- —— (1996). Musica Folklorica Y Tradicional En Los Continentes [Folkloric and Traditional Music on the Continents] (in Spanish). Madrid: Alianza.
- —— (1998). In The Course Of Performance. Chicago: University of Chicago Press.
- —— (2010). Nettl's Elephant. Foreword by Anthony Seeger. Champaign: University of Illinois Press.
- —— (2010). Perverse at Eighty, for Family and Friends. Drawings by Gloria Roubal. Champaign: Elephant & Cat.
- —— (2013). Becoming an Ethnomusicologist: A Miscellany of Influences. Lanham: The Scarecrow Press. ISBN 978-0-8108-8697-1.

Articles

- Nettl, Bruno (2001). "Music". Grove Music Online. Oxford: Oxford University Press. doi:10.1093/gmo/9781561592630.article.40476. ISBN 978-1-56159-263-0. (subscription, Wikilibrary access, or UK public library membership required)
