= Melodic motion =

Quality of movement of a melody

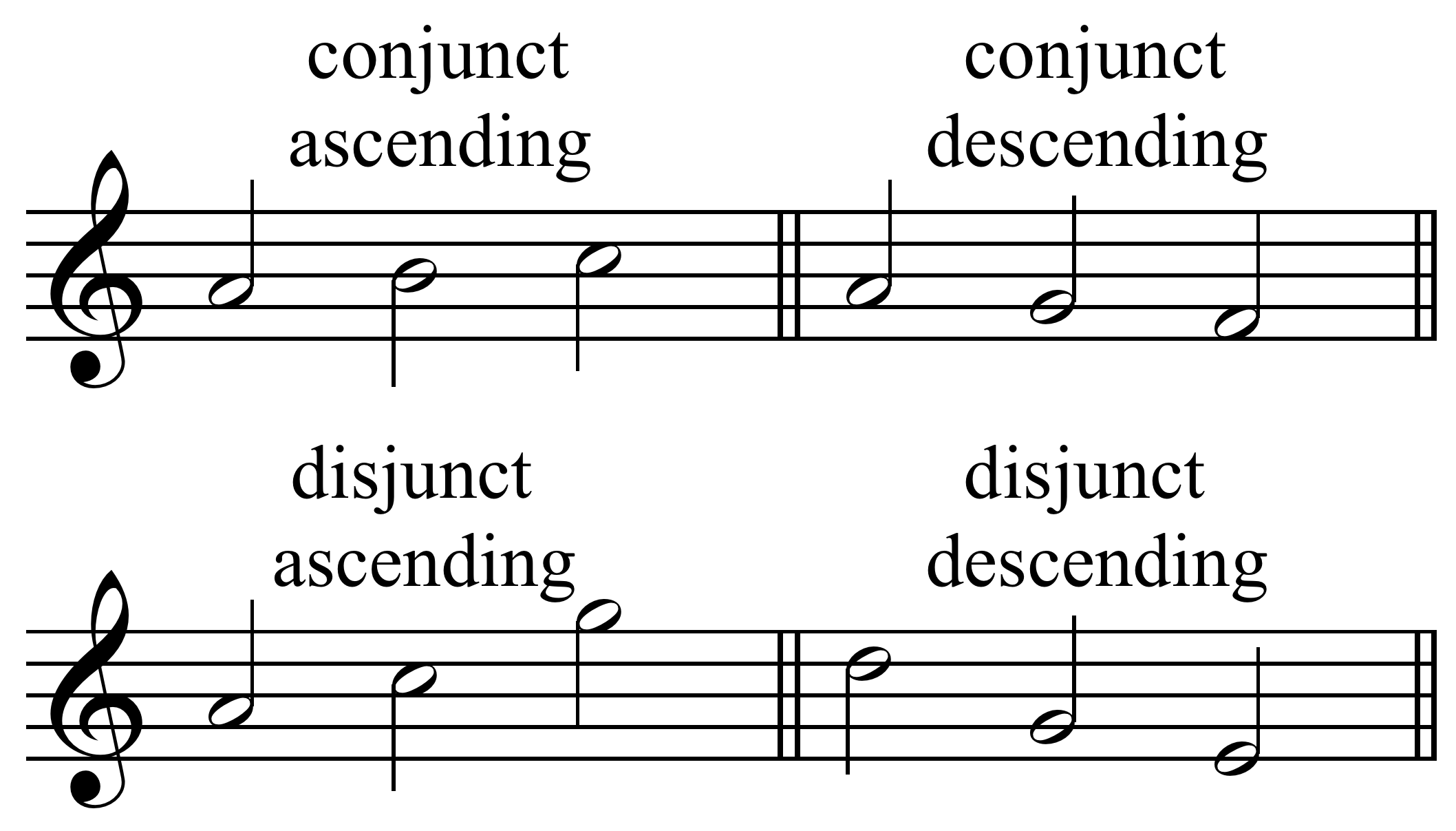
Melodic motion: ascending vs. descending X conjunct vs. disjunct

Melodic motion is the quality of movement of a melody, including nearness or farness of successive pitches or notes in a melody. This may be described as conjunct or disjunct, stepwise, skipwise or no movement, respectively. See also contrapuntal motion. In a conjunct melodic motion, the melodic phrase moves in a stepwise fashion; that is the subsequent notes move up or down a semitone or tone, but no greater. In a disjunct melodic motion, the melodic phrase leaps upwards or downwards; this movement is greater than a whole tone. In popular Western music, a melodic leap of disjunct motion is often present in the chorus of a song, to distinguish it from the verses and captivate the audience.

== In traditional culture music ==
Ethnomusicologist Bruno Nettl describes various types of melodic movement or contour to categorise a song's melody.

There are three general categories, ascending, descending, and undulating:

- Ascending: Upwards melodic movement (only found in remote regions).
- Descending: Downwards melodic movement (prevalent in the New World and Australian music).
- Undulating: Equal movement in both directions, using approximately the same intervals for ascent and descent (prevalent in Old World culture music). Usually concludes with a descending progression.
  - Pendulum: Extreme form of undulating movement that covers a large range and uses large intervals is called pendulum-type melodic movement. Like undulating melodies, usually concludes with a descending progression.

According to Nettl, undulating and descending melodies are far more common than ascending ones.

He also identifies additional specialized types which characterise musical styles with exceptionally homogenous contours, named after the melody contour's trace.

- Tile, terrace, or cascading: a number of descending phrases in which each phrase begins on a higher pitch than the last ended (prevalent in the North American Plain Indians music).
- Arc: The melody rises and falls in roughly equal amounts, the curve ascending gradually to a climax and then dropping off (prevalent among Navajo and North American Indian music)

In addition to this, rise, which may be considered a musical form, is a contrasting section of higher pitch, a "musical plateau".

Other examples include:

- Double tonic: smaller pendular motion in one direction

These all may be modal frames or parts of modal frames.

== See also ==
- Parsons code
- Pitch contour
- Voice leading

== Bibliography ==
- Nettl, Bruno (1956). Music in Primitive Culture. United States of America: Harvard University Press.
