= Vocable =

Meaningful sound uttered by people

In the broadest sense of the word, a vocable (from Latin: vocabulum) is any identifiable utterance or writing, such as a word or term, that is fixed by its language and culture. The use of the term for words in the broad sense is archaic and the term is instead used for utterances which are not considered words, such as the English interjections of assent and denial, uh-huh /əˈhʌ/ and uh-uh /ˈʌʔə/, or the interjection of error, uh-oh /ˈʌʔoʊ/.

Such non-lexical vocables are often used in music, for example la la la or dum dee dum, or in magical incantations, such as abra-cadabra. Scat singing is essentially all vocables. Many Native American songs consist entirely of vocables; this may be due to both phonetic substitution to increase the resonance of the song, and to the trade of songs between nations speaking different languages. Jewish Nigunim also feature wordless melodies composed entirely of vocables such as Yai nai nai or Yai dai dai.

Vocables are common as pause fillers, such as um and er in English, where they have little formal meaning and are rarely purposeful.

Pseudowords that mimic the structure of real words are used in experiments in psycholinguistics and cognitive psychology, for example the nonsense syllables introduced by Hermann Ebbinghaus.

The proto-words of infants, which are meaningful but do not correspond to words of adult speech, are also sometimes called vocables.

== See also ==
- Beatboxing
- Onomatopoeia
- Speech disfluency
