= 43rd Annual Grammy Awards =

2001 US music awards ceremony

- Date: February 21, 2001
- Location: Staples Center, Los Angeles, California
- Hosted by: Jon Stewart
- Most awards: Steely Dan, Dr. Dre, Billy Joel, and Faith Hill (3)
- Most nominations: Dr. Dre (6)
- Website: https://www.grammy.com/awards/43rd-annual-grammy-awards

Television/radio coverage
- Network: CBS

The 43rd Annual Grammy Awards were held on February 21, 2001, at the Staples Center in Los Angeles, California. They recognized accomplishments by musicians from the year 2000. Several artists earned three awards on the night. Steely Dan's haul included Album of the Year for Two Against Nature. U2 took home the Record of the Year and Song of the Year for "Beautiful Day". Dr. Dre won Producer of the Year, Non-Classical and Best Rap Album for Eminem's The Marshall Mathers LP. Eminem himself also received three awards, out of four nominations. Faith Hill took home Best Country Album for the album Breathe, Best Female Country Vocal Performance for the song's title track and Best Country Collaboration with Vocals with Tim McGraw for "Let's Make Love". Madonna opened the show with "Music".

== Performers ==
Artist(s)	Song(s)
Madonna Lil Bow Wow	"Music"
*NSync	"This I Promise You"
Dolly Parton	"Travelin' Prayer"
Destiny's Child	"Independent Women Part I" "Say My Name"
Paul Simon	"You're the One"
Faith Hill	"Breathe"
U2	"Beautiful Day"
Shelby Lynne Sheryl Crow	"The Difficult Kind"
Take 6 Nnenna Freelon	"Straighten Up and Fly Right"
Moby Blue Man Group Jill Scott	"Natural Blues"
Marc-André Hamelin	Studies on Chopin's Études No. 1 by Leopold Godowsky
Macy Gray	"I Try"
Christina Aguilera	"Pero Me Acuerdo De Ti" "Falsas Esperanzas"
Eminem Elton John	"Stan"

== Presenters ==
- Heather Locklear and Kid Rock – presented Best Female Pop Vocal Performance
- Ray Romano and Kevin James – presented Best Pop Vocal Album
- Joe, Jimmy Smits, and Toni Braxton – presented Best Rap Album
- Mýa and Sisqo – presented Best R&B Performance by a Duo or Group with Vocals
- Vince Gill, Lee Ann Womack, and Gloria Estefan – presented Best Latin Pop Album
- Melissa Etheridge, Jenna Elfman, and Carson Daly – presented Best Rock Performance by a Duo or Group with Vocals
- Dolly Parton and Brad Paisley – presented Best Country Album
- Shakira and Richie Sambora – presented Best New Artist
- Erykah Badu and Tony Bennett – presented Best Jazz Vocal Album
- Val Kilmer and Robbie Robertson – presented Best Native American Music Album
- Shelby Lynne and Sheryl Crow – presented Song of the Year
- Carlos Santana and Joni Mitchell – presented Record of the Year
- Stevie Wonder and Bette Midler – presented Album of the Year

== Winners and nominees ==
=== General ===
General Field
Record of the Year
- "Beautiful Day" – U2
  - Brian Eno and Daniel Lanois, producers; Steve Lillywhite and Richard Rainey, engineers/mixers
- "Say My Name" – Destiny's Child
  - Rodney Jerkins, producer; LaShawn Daniels, Brad Gildem and Jean Marie Hurout, engineers/mixers
- "I Try" – Macy Gray
  - Andrew Slater, producer; Dave Way, engineer/mixer
- "Music" – Madonna
  - Mirwais Ahmadzai and Madonna, producers
- "Bye Bye Bye" – *NSYNC
  - Jake Schulze and Kristian Lundin, producers; Mike Tucker, engineer/mixer
Album of the Year
- Two Against Nature – Steely Dan
  - Walter Becker and Donald Fagen, producers; Phil Burnett, Roger Nichols, Dave Russell and Elliot Scheiner, engineers/mixers
- Midnite Vultures – Beck
  - Beck Hansen and Dust Brothers, producers
- The Marshall Mathers LP – Eminem
  - Jeff Bass, Mark Bass, Dr. Dre, Tommy Coster, Eminem and the 45 King, producers; Rich Behrens, Mike Butler, Chris Conway, Rob Ebeling, Michelle Forbes, Richard Segal Huredia, Steve King, Aaron Lepley, James McCrone, Akane Nakamura and Lance Pierre, engineers/mixers
- Kid A – Radiohead
  - Radiohead, producer; Nigel Godrich, engineer/mixer
- You're the One – Paul Simon
  - Paul Simon, producer; Andy Smith, engineer/mixer
Song of the Year
- "Beautiful Day"
  - U2, songwriters (U2)
- "Breathe"
  - Stephanie Bentley and Holly Lamar, songwriters (Faith Hill)
- "I Hope You Dance"
  - Mark D. Sanders and Tia Sellers, songwriters (Lee Ann Womack)
- "I Try"
  - Macy Gray, Jinsoo Lim, Jeremy Ruzumna and David Wilder, songwriters (Macy Gray)
- "Say My Name"
  - LaShawn Daniels, Fred Jerkins III, Rodney Jerkins, Beyoncé Knowles, LeToya Luckett, LaTavia Roberson and Kelendria Rowland, songwriters (Destiny's Child)
Best New Artist
- Shelby Lynne
  - Brad Paisley
  - Papa Roach
  - Jill Scott
  - Sisqó

=== Alternative ===
Alternative
Best Alternative Music Album
- Kid A – Radiohead
  - When the Pawn – Fiona Apple
  - Midnite Vultures – Beck
  - Bloodflowers – The Cure
  - Liverpool Sound Collage – Paul McCartney

=== Blues ===
Blues
Best Traditional Blues Album: Riding with the King – B. B. King and Eric Clapton; Superharps – James Cotton, Billy Branch, Charlie Musselwhite, and Sugar Ray Norcia; Milk Cow Blues – Willie Nelson; Let the Good Times Roll – B. B. King; Delta Crossroads – Robert Lockwood Jr.	Best Contemporary Blues Album: Shoutin' in Key – Taj Mahal and the Phantom Blues Band; Wicked – Shemekia Copeland; Shake Hands with Shorty – North Mississippi Allstars; Royal Blue – Koko Taylor; Hoochie Man – Bobby Rush

=== Children's ===
Children's
Best Musical Album for Children: Woody's Roundup: A Rootin' Tootin' Collection of Woody's Favorite Songs – Riders in the Sky; This Pretty Planet – Tom Chapin; Still the Same Me – Sweet Honey in the Rock; Pillow Full of Wishes – Cathy Fink & Marcy Marxer; More Songs from Pooh Corner – Kenny Loggins	Best Spoken Word Album for Children: Harry Potter and the Goblet of Fire – Jim Dale; The Polar Express – Liam Neeson; The Christmas Miracle of Jonathan Toomey – James Earl Jones; The Adventures of Tom Sawyer – Paul Newman; Dinosongs: Poems to Celebrate a T. Rex Named Sue – Susan Sarandon

=== Classical ===
- Best Orchestral Performance
  - Stephen Johns (producer), Mike Clements (engineer), Sir Simon Rattle (conductor) and the Berliner Philharmonic for Mahler: Sym. No. 10
- Best Classical Vocal Performance
  - Christopher Raeburn (producer), Jonathan Stokes (engineer), Cecilia Bartoli and Il Giardino Armonico for The Vivaldi Album (Dell'aura al sussurrar; Alma oppressa, Etc.)
- Best Opera Recording
  - Martin Sauer (producer), Jean Chatauret (engineer), Kent Nagano (conductor), Kim Begley, Dietrich Fischer-Dieskau, Dietrich Henschel, Markus Hollop, Eva Jenis, Torsten Kerl and the Orchestre de l'Opera Nationale de Lyon for Busoni: Doktor Faust
- Best Choral Performance
  - Karen Wilson (producer), Don Harder (engineer), Helmuth Rilling (conductor) and the Oregon Bach Festival Orchestra and Chorus for Penderecki: Credo
- Best Instrumental Soloist(s) Performance (with orchestra)
  - Grace Row (producer), Charles Harbutt (engineer), Roger Norrington (conductor), Joshua Bell and the London Philharmonic for Maw: Violin Concerto
- Best Instrumental Soloist Performance (without orchestra)
  - Tobias Lehmann (producer), Jens Schünemann (engineer) and Sharon Isbin for Dreams of a World (Works of Lauro, Ruiz-Pipo, Duarte, Etc.)
- Best Small Ensemble Performance (with or without conductor)
  - Christian Gausch (producer), Wolf-Dieter Karwatky (engineer) and the Orpheus Chamber Orchestra for Shadow Dances (Stravinsky Miniatures - Tango; Suite No. 1; Octet, etc.)
- Best Chamber Music Performance
  - Da-Hong Seetoo, Max Wilcox (producers and engineers) and the Emerson String Quartet for Shostakovich: The String Quartets
- Best Classical Contemporary Composition
  - George Crumb (composer) and Thomas Conlin for Crumb: Star-Child
- Best Classical Album
  - Da-Hong Seetoo and Max Wilcox (producers and engineers) and the Emerson String Quartet for Shostakovich: The String Quartets
- Best Classical Crossover Album
  - Steven Epstein (producer), Richard King (engineer), Yo-Yo Ma, Edgar Meyer and Mark O'Connor for Appalachian Journey

=== Composing and arranging ===
Composing and arranging
Best Instrumental Composition: "Theme from Angela's Ashes"; John Williams, composer (John Williams); "The Templars"; Ralph Towner, composer (Oregon with the Tchaikovsky Symphony Orchestra); "The Egg Travels"; James Newton Howard, composer (James Newton Howard); "Sing, Sang, Sung"; Gordon Goodwin, composer (Gordon Goodwin's Big Phat Band); "Round Robin"; Paul McCandless, composer (Oregon with the Tchaikovsky Symphony Orchestra)	Best Instrumental Arrangement: "Spain for Sextet & Orchestra"; Chick Corea, arranger (Chick Corea); "The Summer Knows/Estate"; Jorge Calandrelli, arranger (Ettore Stratta & His Orchestra); "Round Robin"; Paul McCandless, arranger (Oregon with the Tchaikovsky Symphony Orchestra); "Nice Work If You Can Get It"; Jim McNeely, arranger (The Danish Radio Jazz Orchestra and Jim McNeely); "Bach 2 Part Invention in D Minor"; Gordon Goodwin, arranger (Gordon Goodwin's Big Phat Band)
Best Instrumental Arrangement Accompanying Vocalist(s): "Both Sides Now"; Vince Mendoza, arranger (Joni Mitchell); "I've Seen It All"; Björk, Vince Mendoza, and Guy Sigsworth, arrangers (Björk featuring Thom Yorke); "Dream"; Jorge Calandrelli, arranger (Ettore Stratta & His Orchestra); "Button Up Your Overcoat"; Nnenna Freelon, arranger (Nnenna Freelon); "A Case of You"; Vince Mendoza, arranger (Joni Mitchell)

=== Country ===
Country
Best Female Country Vocal Performance: "Breathe" – Faith Hill; "Travelin' Prayer" – Dolly Parton; "That's the Way" – Jo Dee Messina; "Real Live Woman" – Trisha Yearwood; "I Hope You Dance" – Lee Ann Womack	Best Male Country Vocal Performance: "Solitary Man" – Johnny Cash; "One Voice" – Billy Gilman; "My Best Friend" – Tim McGraw; "Feels Like Love" – Vince Gill; "A Thousand Miles from Nowhere" – Dwight Yoakam
Best Country Performance by a Duo or Group with Vocal: "Cherokee Maiden" – Asleep at the Wheel; "You'll Always Be Loved by Me" – Brooks & Dunn; "Woody's Roundup" – Riders in the Sky; "Twentieth Century" – Alabama; "Jimmy's Got a Girlfriend" – The Wilkinsons	Best Country Performance by a Duo or Group with Vocal: "Let's Make Love" – Faith Hill and Tim McGraw; "When I Look Into Your Heart" – Vince Gill and Amy Grant; "Walk Softly" – Ricky Skaggs and the Dixie Chicks; "Strong Enough (Live)" – Sheryl Crow featuring the Dixie Chicks; "Murder on Music Row" – George Strait and Alan Jackson
Best Country Instrumental Performance: "Leaving Cottondale" – Alison Brown and Béla Fleck; "The Second Mouse" – Tim O'Brien and Darrell Scott; "Rollercoaster" – Keith Urban; "Ode to a Butterfly" – Nickel Creek; "Bloodlines" – Steve Wariner and Ryan Wariner	Best Country Song: "I Hope You Dance"; Mark D. Sanders and Tia Sillers, songwriters (Lee Ann Womack); "The Way You Love Me"; Michael Dulaney and Keith Follesé, songwriters (Faith Hill); "One Voice"; Don Cook and David Malloy, songwriters (Billy Gilman); "Feels Like Love"; Vince Gill, songwriter (Vince Gill); "Breathe"; Stephanie Bentley and Holly Lamar, songwriters (Faith Hill)
Best Country Album: Breathe – Faith Hill; Under the Influence – Alan Jackson; Real Live Woman – Trisha Yearwood; Let's Make Sure We Kiss Goodbye – Vince Gill; I Hope You Dance – Lee Ann Womack	Best Bluegrass Album: The Grass Is Blue – Dolly Parton; Nickel Creek – Nickel Creek; Murder on Music Row – Larry Cordle & Lonesome Standard Time; Fair Weather – Alison Brown; Big Mon: The Songs of Bill Monroe – Ricky Skaggs & Friends

=== Film/TV/media ===
Film/TV/media
Best Compilation Soundtrack Album for a Motion Picture, Television or Other Visual Media: Almost Famous – Danny Bramson and Cameron Crowe, producers (Various Artists); The Sopranos – Martin Bruestle and David Chase, producers (Various Artists); Magnolia – Aimee Mann; High Fidelity – John Cusack and Kathy Nelson, producers (Various Artists); Fantasia 2000 – Jay David Saks, producer (James Levine Conducting the Chicago Symphony Orchestra)	Best Score Soundtrack Album for a Motion Picture, Television or Other Visual Media: American Beauty – Thomas Newman; Toy Story 2 – Randy Newman; The Cider House Rules – Rachel Portman; Magnolia – Jon Brion; Gladiator – Hans Zimmer and Lisa Gerrard
Best Song Written for a Motion Picture, Television or Other Visual Media: "When She Loved Me" from Toy Story 2; Randy Newman, songwriter (Sarah McLachlan); "Things Have Changed" from Wonder Boys; Bob Dylan, songwriter (Bob Dylan); "The Great Beyond" from Man on the Moon; Peter Buck, Mike Mills, and Michael Stipe, songwriters (R.E.M.); "Save Me" from Magnolia; Aimee Mann, songwriter (Aimee Mann); "Independent Women Part I" from Charlie's Angels; Samuel Barnes, Beyoncé Knowles, Jean-Claude Olivier, and Cory Rooney, songwriters (Destiny's Child)

=== Folk ===
Folk
Best Traditional Folk Album: Public Domain: Songs from the Wild Land – Dave Alvin; My Roots Are Showing – Natalie MacMaster; Live at the Royal Albert Hall – Ladysmith Black Mambazo; Far Away, Down on a Georgia Farm – Norman Blake; Cajun Blood – Jo-El Sonnier	Best Contemporary Folk Album: Red Dirt Girl – Emmylou Harris; Transcendental Blues – Steve Earle; Mermaid Avenue Vol. II – Billy Bragg and Wilco; Crossing Muddy Waters – John Hiatt; American III: Solitary Man – Johnny Cash
Best Native American Music Album: Gathering of Nations Pow Wow 1999 – Various artists; Veterans Songs – Lakota Thunder; Tribute to the Elders – Black Lodge Singers; Peacemaker's Journey – Joanne Shenandoah; Cheyenne Nation – Joseph Fire Crow

=== Gospel ===
Gospel
Best Pop/Contemporary Gospel Album: If I Left the Zoo – Jars of Clay; This Is Your Time – Michael W. Smith; Joy: A Christmas Collection – Avalon; Fearless – Crystal Lewis; Crystal Clear – Jaci Velasquez	Best Rock Gospel Album: Double Take – Petra; Third Verse – Smalltown Poets; Offerings – Third Day; Learning to Breathe – Switchfoot; Lay It Down – Jennifer Knapp
Best Southern, Country or Bluegrass Gospel Album: Soldier of the Cross – Ricky Skaggs & Kentucky Thunder; The Great Gospel Hit Parade: From Memphis to Nashville to Texas – James Blackwood, The Jordanaires, and Light Crust Doughboys; A Farewell Celebration – The Cathedrals; Old Ways & Old Paths – Paul Williams and the Victory Trio; Just Over in Heaven – Doyle Lawson and Quicksilver	Best Gospel Choir or Chorus Album: Live: God Is Working – Brooklyn Tabernacle Choir; Tri-city4.com – Donald Lawrence Presents the Tri-City Singers; Send Up the Praise – University of Mississippi Gospel Choir; Higher – Youth for Christ; Get Your Praise On – New Direction
Best Traditional Gospel Album: You Can Make It – Shirley Caesar; The Concert – The Williams Brothers; Ole Rickety Bridge – Dorothy Norwood; It Was You – Mighty Clouds of Joy; Family & Friends Live from Detroit – Rev. James Moore; Devotion – Aaron Neville	Best Contemporary Soul Gospel Album: Thankful – Mary Mary; Purpose by Design – Fred Hammond and Radical for Christ; Love & Freedom – BeBe Winans; Family Affair – Hezekiah Walker and the Love Fellowship Crusade Choir; Alabaster Box – CeCe Winans

=== Historical ===
Best Historical Album
- The Complete Hot Five and Hot Seven Recordings
  - Steve Berkowitz, Seth Rothstein, and Phil Schaap, compilation producers; Michael Brooks, Seth Foster, Andreas Meyer, Woody Pornpitaksuk, Ken Robertson, Tom "Curly" Ruff, Phil Schaap, and Mark Wilder, mastering engineers (Louis Armstrong)
- The Rubinstein Collection
  - Harold Hagopian, Edward Houser, Nathaniel S. Johnson, Jon M. Samuels, and Max Wilcox, compilation producers; Hsi-Ling Chang, Thomas Mac Cluskey, Marian M. Conaty, Michael O. Drexler, Ward Marston, James Nichols, Francis X. Pierce, Jon M. Samuels, and Michael Sobol, mastering engineers (Arthur Rubinstein)
- The Best of Broadside 1962–1988: Anthems of the American Underground from the Pages of Broadside Magazine
  - Ronald D. Cohen and Jeff Place, compilation producers; Pete Reiniger, mastering engineer (Various Artists)
- Respect: A Century of Women in Music
  - Julie D'Angelo and Holly George-Warren, compilation producers; Dan Hersch and Bill Inglot, mastering engineers (Various Artists)
- Great Moments of the 20th Century
  - Michael Wesley Johnson, David McLees, and Gordon Skene, compilation producers; Bob Fisher, mastering engineer (Various Artists)

=== Jazz ===
Jazz
Best Jazz Instrumental Solo: "(Go) Get It" – Pat Metheny; "Passion Dance" – Kenny Barron; "Outrance" – Michael Brecker; "I Thought About You" – Terence Blanchard; "I Got It Bad and That Ain't Good" – Keith Jarrett	Best Jazz Instrumental Album, Individual or Group: Contemporary Jazz – Branford Marsalis Quartet; Time Is of the Essence – Michael Brecker; Spirit Song – Kenny Barron; Prime Directive – Dave Holland Quintet; In & Out – Martial Solal and Johnny Griffin
Best Large Jazz Ensemble Album: 52nd Street Themes – Joe Lovano; In Concert - The Music Of William 'Buddy' Collette – Buddy Collette Big Band; Nice Work – The Danish Radio Jazz Orchestra and Jim McNeely; Culmination – Sam Rivers' Rivbea All-Star Orchestra; Allégresse – Maria Schneider Orchestra	Best Latin Jazz Album: Live at the Village Vanguard – Chucho Valdés; Motherland – Danilo Pérez; Melaza – David Sánchez; Libertango – Gary Burton; Afro-Cuban Dream: Live and in Clave – Bobby Sanabria Big Band
Best Contemporary Jazz Album: Outbound – Béla Fleck and the Flecktones; Yes, Please! – Fourplay; Re:Animation Live! – Hagans/Belden; Here's the Deal – Liquid Soul; A Brighter Day – Ronny Jordan	Best Jazz Vocal Album: In the Moment – Live in Concert – Dianne Reeves; Soulcall – Nnenna Freelon; Merry Go Round – Freddy Cole; Live in Chicago – Kurt Elling; Live at Yoshi's – Dee Dee Bridgewater

=== Latin ===
Latin
Best Latin Pop Album: MTV Unplugged – Shakira; Vivo – Luis Miguel; Oscar De La Hoya – Oscar De La Hoya; Mi Reflejo – Christina Aguilera; El Alma al Aire – Alejandro Sanz	Best Latin Rock/Alternative Album: Uno – La Ley; No Podemos Volar – El Tri; La Extraordinaria Paradoja del Sonido Quijano – Café Quijano; Arepa 3000 – Los Amigos Invisibles; Abre – Fito Páez
Best Traditional Tropical Latin Album: Alma Caribeña – Gloria Estefan; Tribute to the Cuarteto Patria – Eliades Ochoa; Rhythms for a New Millennium – Alex Acuña y su Acuarela de Tambores; Cuba Linda – Cachao; Buena Vista Social Club Presents Omara Portuondo – Omara Portuondo	Best Salsa Album: Masterpiece/Obra Maestra – Tito Puente and Eddie Palmieri; Son by Four – Son by Four; Hablando del Amor – Tony Vega; Evolución – Luis Enrique; Celia Cruz and Friends: A Night of Salsa – Celia Cruz
Best Merengue Album: Olga Viva, Viva Olga – Olga Tañón; Voy a Enamorarte – Gisselle; Masters of the Stage – Grupo Manía; Live – Ilegales; El Padrino – Fulanito	Best Mexican/Mexican-American Album: Por Una Mujer Bonita – Pepe Aguilar; Quémame Los Ojos – Ramón Ayala y sus Bravos del Norte; Lobo Herido – Vicente Fernández; Decimo Aniversario – Los Terribles del Norte; Atrapando tu Corazon – Grupo Atrapado
Best Tejano Album: ¿Qué Es Música Tejana? – The Legends; Siempra Cuenta Conmigo – Leonardo Gonzales y Los Magnificos; Quien Iva a Pensar – Jimmy González y Grupo Mazz; Hasta La Cima Del Cielo – Solido; En Vivo...Puro Party Live II – Jaime y Los Chamacos

=== Musical show ===
Musical Show
Best Musical Show Album
- Elton John and Tim Rice's Aida – Elton John, composer; Tim Rice, lyricist; Guy Babylon, Paul Bogaev, Frank Filipetti, and Chris Montan, producers; Frank Filipetti, engineer/mixer (Original Broadway Cast)
  - The Wild Party – Michael John LaChiusa, composer/lyricist; Phil Ramone, producer (Original Cast with Toni Collette, Mandy Patinkin, and Eartha Kitt)
  - Swing! – Steven Epstein, producer (Original Cast Recording)
  - Meredith Willson's The Music Man – Hugh Fordin, producer (New Broadway Cast)
  - Kiss Me, Kate – Hugh Fordin, Paul Gemignani, and Don Sebesky, producers (Brian Stokes Mitchell and Marin Mazzie with New Broadway Cast)

=== Music video ===
- Best Long Form Music Video
  - Gimme Some Truth - The Making of John Lennon's Imagine Album - Andrew Solt (video director and producer); Greg Vines, Leslie Tong and Yoko Ono (video producers)
- Best Short Form Music Video
  - "Learn To Fly" - Foo Fighters (artists); Jesse Peretz (video director); Tina Nakane (video producer)

=== New Age ===
New Age
Best New Age Album
- Thinking of You – Kitarō
  - Whisper to the Wild Water – Máire Brennan
  - In a Distant Place – R. Carlos Nakai, William Eaton, Will Clipman, and Nawang Khechog
  - Highland Cathedral – Phil Coulter
  - East of the Moon – David Lenz

=== Packaging and notes ===
Best Recording Package: Music; Kevin Reagan, art director (Madonna); Zenith; Rachel Gutek and Jonathan Lea, art directors (The Jigsaw Seen); The Shaming of the True; Hugh Brown and John Seabury, art directors (Kevin Gilbert; The Concert for García Lorca; Dan Ibarra and Kevin Wade, art directors (Ben Sidran); Machina/The Machines of God; Billy Corgan, Gregory Sylvester, Thomas Wolfe, and Yelena Yemchuk, art directors (The Smashing Pumpkins)	Best Boxed Recording Package: Miles Davis and John Coltrane: The Complete Columbia Recordings 1955-1961; Arnold Levine and Frank Harkins, art directors (Miles Davis and John Coltrane); The Complete Lester Young Studio Sessions on Verve; Hollis King, art director (Lester Young); Respect: A Century of Women in Music; Rachel Gutek, art director (Various Artists); Louis Armstrong: The Complete Hot Five and Hot Seven Recordings; Ian Cuttler, art director (Louis Armstrong); Hampton Comes Alive; Jared Eberhardt, Michael Jager, and Todd Wender, art directors (Phish)
Best Album Notes: Miles Davis and John Coltrane: The Complete Columbia Recordings 1955-1961; Bob Blumenthal, album notes writer (Miles Davis and John Coltrane); Yes I Can! The Sammy Davis Jr. Story; Gerald Early, album notes writer (Sammy Davis Jr.); The Remains of Tom Lehrer; Dr. Demento, album notes writer (Tom Lehrer); The Complete Lester Young Studio Sessions on Verve; John Chilton, album notes writer (Lester Young); The Best of Broadside 1962–1988: Anthems of the American Underground from the Pages of Broadside Magazine; Jeff Place, album notes writer (Various Artists); Hotcakes & Outtakes: 30 Years of Little Feat; Bud Scoppa, album notes writer (Little Feat)

=== Polka ===
Polka
Best Polka Album
- Touched by a Polka – Jimmy Sturr
  - SqueezeBox – LynnMarie
  - Mi Lenny Um – Lenny Gomulka and Chicago Push
  - Let's Dance! – Walter Ostanek
  - Another Day at the Office – Eddie Blazonczyk's Versatones

=== Pop ===
Pop
Best Female Pop Vocal Performance: "I Try" – Macy Gray; "What a Girl Wants" – Christina Aguilera; "Music" – Madonna; "Save Me" – Aimee Mann; "Both Sides Now" – Joni Mitchell; "Oops!...I Did It Again" – Britney Spears	Best Male Pop Vocal Performance: "She Walks This Earth" – Sting; "You Sang to Me" – Marc Anthony; "Taking You Home" – Don Henley; "She Bangs" – Ricky Martin; "6, 8, 12" – Brian McKnight
Best Pop Performance by a Duo or Group with Vocals: "Cousin Dupree" – Steely Dan; "Show Me The Meaning Of Being Lonely" – Backstreet Boys; "Pinch Me" – Barenaked Ladies; "Breathless" – The Corrs; "Bye Bye Bye" – *NSYNC	Best Pop Collaboration with Vocals: "Is You Is or Is You Ain't My Baby" – B.B. King and Dr. John; "Thank God I Found You" – Mariah Carey, 98 Degrees, and Joe; "The Difficult Kind" – Sheryl Crow and Sarah McLachlan; "All the Way" – Celine Dion and Frank Sinatra; "Turn Your Lights Down Low" – Lauryn Hill and Bob Marley
Best Pop Instrumental Performance: "Caravan" – The Brian Setzer Orchestra; "Zona Mona" – Béla Fleck and the Flecktones; "Rebel Heart" – The Corrs; "Overture (Selmasongs)" – Björk; Vince Mendoza, conductor; "Camaleao" – Grover Washington Jr.	Best Dance Recording: "Who Let the Dogs Out" – Baha Men; "Natural Blues" – Moby; "Let's Get Loud" – Jennifer Lopez; "Blue (Da Ba Dee)" – Eiffel 65; "Be with You" – Enrique Iglesias
Best Pop Vocal Album: Two Against Nature – Steely Dan; Oops!... I Did It Again – Britney Spears; No Strings Attached – *NSYNC; Music – Madonna; Inside Job – Don Henley	Best Pop Instrumental Album: Symphony No. 1 - Joe Jackson; Pieces in a Modern Style – William Orbit; Hymns in the Garden – Kirk Whalum; Faith: A Holiday Album – Kenny G; Audio – Blue Man Group

=== Production and engineering ===
Best Engineered Album, Non-Classical

- Dave Russell, Elliot Scheiner, Phil Burnett and Roger Nichols (engineers) for Two Against Nature performed by Steely Dan

Best Engineered Album, Classical

- John M. Eargle (engineer) for Dvorák: Requiem, Op. 89; Sym. No. 9, Op. 95 "From the New World"

Producer of the Year, Non-Classical

- Dr. Dre

Producer of the Year, Classical

- Steven Epstein

Remixer of the Year, Non-Classical

- Hex Hector

=== R&B ===
R&B
Best Female R&B Vocal Performance: "He Wasn't Man Enough" – Toni Braxton; "Try Again" – Aaliyah; "Bag Lady" – Erykah Badu; "As We Lay" – Kelly Price; "Gettin' in the Way" – Jill Scott	Best Male R&B Vocal Performance: "Untitled (How Does It Feel)" – D'Angelo; "I Wanna Know" – Joe; "I Wish" – R. Kelly; "Stay or Let It Go" – Brian McKnight; "Thong Song" – Sisqo
Best R&B Performance by a Duo or Group with Vocal: "Say My Name" – Destiny's Child; "Pass You By" – Boyz II Men; "911" – Wyclef Jean featuring Mary J. Blige; "Dance Tonight" – Lucy Pearl; "Coming Back Home" – BeBe Winans featuring Brian McKnight and Joe	Best R&B Song: "Say My Name"; LaShawn Daniels, Fred Jerkins III, Rodney Jerkins, Beyoncé Knowles, LeToya Luckett, LaTavia Roberson and Kelendria Rowland, songwriters (Destiny's Child); "Bag Lady"; Erykah Badu, songwriter (Erykah Badu); "He Wasn't Man Enough"; LaShawn Daniels, Fred Jerkins III, Rodney Jerkins, & Harvey Mason Jr., songwriters (Toni Braxton); "Thong Song"; Mark Andrews, Tim Kelley, & Bob Robinson, songwriters (Sisqó); "Untitled (How Does It Feel)"; D'Angelo & Raphael Saadiq, songwriters (D'Angelo)
Best R&B Album: Voodoo – D'Angelo; Nathan Michael Shawn Wanya – Boyz II Men; The Heat – Toni Braxton; My Name Is Joe – Joe; Who Is Jill Scott? Words and Sounds Vol. 1 – Jill Scott; Unleash the Dragon – Sisqó	Best Traditional R&B Vocal Album: Ear-Resistible – The Temptations; All the Man You Need – Will Downing; Cool – George Duke; That's for Sure – Jeffrey Osborne; Gotta Get the Groove Back – Johnnie Taylor

=== Rap ===
Rap
Best Rap Solo Performance: "The Real Slim Shady" – Eminem; "The Light" – Common; "Party Up (Up in Here)" – DMX; "Shake Ya Ass" – Mystikal; "Country Grammar" – Nelly	Best Rap Performance by a Duo or Group: "Forgot About Dre" – Dr. Dre featuring Eminem; "Alive" – Beastie Boys; "Oooh." – De La Soul featuring Redman; "The Next Episode" – Dr. Dre featuring Snoop Dogg; "Big Pimpin'" – Jay-Z featuring UGK
Best Rap Album: The Marshall Mathers LP – Eminem; ... And Then There Was X – DMX; 2001 – Dr. Dre; Vol. 3... Life and Times of S. Carter – Jay-Z; Country Grammar – Nelly

=== Reggae ===
Reggae
Best Reggae Album
- Art and Life – Beenie Man
  - Private & Confidential – Gregory Isaacs
  - Life is a Miracle – Pato Banton
  - Let Me Be the One – Dennis Brown
  - Equality – The Wailing Souls

=== Rock ===
Rock
Best Female Rock Vocal Performance: "There Goes the Neighborhood (Live)" – Sheryl Crow; "Paper Bag" – Fiona Apple; "Enough Of Me" – Melissa Etheridge; "So Pure" – Alanis Morissette; "Glitter In Their Eyes" – Patti Smith	Best Male Rock Vocal Performance: "Again" – Lenny Kravitz; "Thursday's Child" – David Bowie; "Things Have Changed" – Bob Dylan; "Workin' It" – Don Henley; "Into The Void" – Nine Inch Nails
Best Rock Performance by a Duo or Group with Vocal: "Beautiful Day" – U2; "It's My Life" – Bon Jovi; "With Arms Wide Open" – Creed; "Learn To Fly" – Foo Fighters; "Californication" – Red Hot Chili Peppers	Best Hard Rock Performance: "Guerrilla Radio" – Rage Against the Machine; "American Bad Ass" – Kid Rock; "Take A Look Around (Theme From "M:I-2")" – Limp Bizkit; "Grievance" – Pearl Jam; "Down" – Stone Temple Pilots
Best Metal Performance: "Elite" – Deftones; "The Wicker Man" – Iron Maiden; "Astonishing Panorama Of The Endtimes" – Marilyn Manson; "Revolution Is My Name" – Pantera; "Wait And Bleed" – Slipknot	Best Rock Instrumental Performance: Michael Kamen, Metallica and the San Francisco Symphony Orchestra – "The Call of Ktulu"; Peter Frampton – "Off the Hook"; Phish – "First Tube"; Joe Satriani – "Until We Say Goodbye"; Kenny Wayne Shepherd Band – "Electric Lullaby"
Best Rock Song: "With Arms Wide Open"; Scott Stapp and Mark Tremonti, songwriters (Creed); "Kryptonite"; Brad Arnold, Todd Harrell, and Matt Roberts, songwriters (3 Doors Down); "Again"; Lenny Kravitz, songwriter (Lenny Kravitz); "Bent"; Rob Thomas, songwriter (Matchbox Twenty); "Californication"; Flea, John Frusciante, Anthony Kiedis, and Chad Smith, songwriters (Red Hot Chili Peppers)	Best Rock Album: There Is Nothing Left to Lose – Foo Fighters; Crush – Bon Jovi; Mad Season – Matchbox Twenty; Return of Saturn – No Doubt; The Battle of Los Angeles – Rage Against the Machine

=== Spoken ===
Spoken
Best Spoken Word Album: The Measure of a Man: A Spiritual Autobiography – Sidney Poitier; The Complete Shakespeare Sonnets – Various artists; Shopgirl – Steve Martin; On the Road – Unabridged – Matt Dillon; Married to Laughter – A Love Story featuring Anne Meara – Jerry Stiller	Best Spoken Comedy Album: Brain Droppings – George Carlin; The Prisoner of Second Avenue – Richard Dreyfuss and Marsha Mason; The Original Kings of Comedy – Steve Harvey, D. L. Hughley, Cedric the Entertainer, and Bernie Mac; I Rant, Therefore I Am – Dennis Miller; Big Funny – Jeff Foxworthy

=== Traditional pop ===
Traditional pop
Best Traditional Pop Vocal Album
- Both Sides Now – Joni Mitchell
  - Timeless: Live in Concert – Barbra Streisand
  - Songs from the Last Century – George Michael
  - It's Like This – Rickie Lee Jones
  - As Time Goes By – Bryan Ferry

=== World ===
World music
Best World Music Album
- João Voz e Violão – João Gilberto
  - Water from the Well – The Chieftains
  - Journey with the Sun – Paul Winter and the Earth Band
  - Joko (The Link) – Youssou N'Dour
  - Homeland – Miriam Makeba

== Special Merit Awards ==
- MusiCares Person of the Year
  - Paul Simon
- Lifetime Achievement Award
  - The Beach Boys
  - Tony Bennett
  - Sammy Davis Jr.
  - Bob Marley
  - The Who

== Trivia ==
- The three awards Steely Dan won were their first ever career Grammy wins.
- Eminem's controversial The Marshall Mathers LP, which had several nominations, including Album of the Year, caused outrage. 200 protesters on behalf of GLAAD and other groups gathered outside the Staples Center to protest Eminem's album which they considered homophobic and sexist. He performed his hit single "Stan" as a duet with openly gay musician Elton John at the ceremony in response to these allegations. This version is also featured as the final track on Eminem's 2005 compilation Curtain Call: The Hits.
