= Grammy Award for Best Native American Music Album =

Honor presented to recording artists for quality Native American music albums

- Awarded for: Quality works in the Native American music genre
- Country: United States
- Presented by: National Academy of Recording Arts and Sciences
- First award: 2001
- Final award: 2011
- Website: grammy.com

The Grammy Award for Best Native American Music Album was an award presented at the Grammy Awards to recording artists for quality albums in the Native American music genre. Honors in several categories are presented at the ceremony annually by the National Academy of Recording Arts and Sciences of the United States to "honor artistic achievement, technical proficiency and overall excellence in the recording industry, without regard to album sales or chart position".

Following a three-year lobbying effort by Ellen Bello, founder of the Native American Music Awards and the Native American Music Association, the Grammy award was first presented to Tom Bee and Douglas Spotted Eagle in 2001 as the producers of the compilation album Gathering of Nations Pow Wow. Previously, Native American recordings had been placed in the folk, world or new-age music categories. While some Native American artists criticized the award category for being "too narrowly defined to accommodate the breadth of today's Indian music", others took pride in its inclusion. The name of the award remained unchanged between 2001 and 2011. According to the category description guide for the 52nd Grammy Awards, the award was presented to "vocal or instrumental Native American music albums containing at least 51% playing time of newly recorded music", with the intent to honor recordings of a more "traditional nature".

As performing artists, Bill Miller and Mary Youngblood share the record for the most wins in this category, with two each. Thomas Wasinger holds the record for the most wins as a producer, with three. The group Black Lodge Singers holds the record for the most nominations without a win, with seven. In 2011, the category Best Native American Music Album was eliminated along with thirty others due to a major overhaul by the Recording Academy. Four additional categories in the American Roots Music field were eliminated (Best Contemporary Folk Album, Best Hawaiian Music Album, Best Traditional Folk Album, Best Zydeco or Cajun Music Album). Native American works will now be eligible for the Best Regional Roots Music Album category.

== Recipients ==
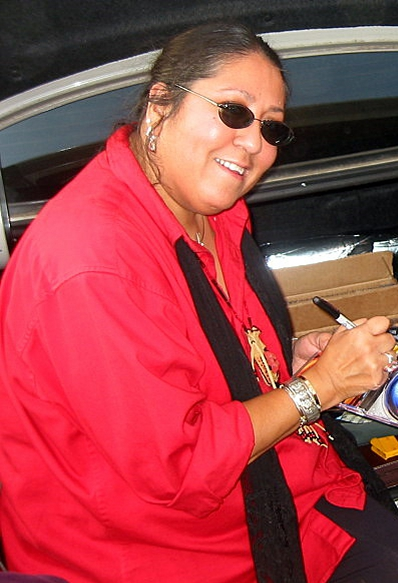
2003 and 2007 winner Mary Youngblood

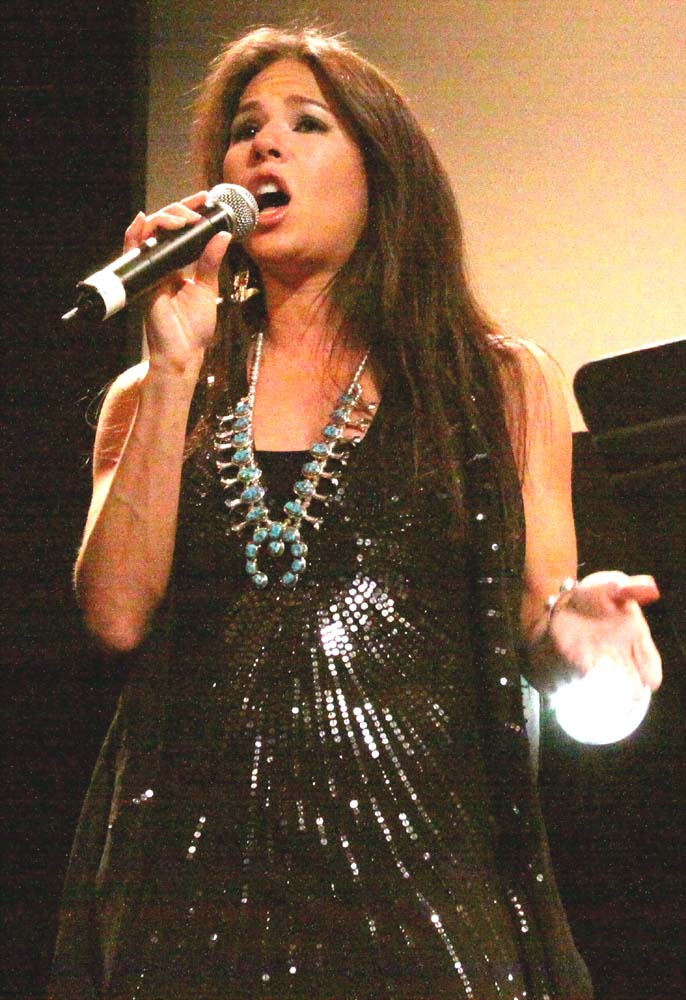
2007 nominee Jana, performing in Ponca City, Oklahoma in 2010

Year^{[I]}	Performing artist(s)	Work	Producer(s)	Nominees	Ref.
2001	Various artists	Gathering of Nations Pow Wow 1999	Tom Bee; Douglas Spotted Eagle	Black Lodge Singers – Tribute to the Elders; Joseph Fire Crow – Cheyenne Nation; Lakota Thunder – Veterans Songs; Joanne Shenandoah – Peacemaker's Journey	
2002	Johnny Mike and Verdell Primeaux	Bless the People: Harmonized Peyote Songs	Giuli Doyle; Robert Doyle	Black Eagle – Life Goes On: Hand Drum and Round Dance Songs; Black Lodge Singers – Weasel Tail's Dream: The Tradition Continues; Northern Cree – Rockin' the Rez; Various Northern Drums – Gathering of Nations 2000: Millennium Celebration, Volume 1; Young Bird – Change of Life: Oklahoma Pow-Wow Songs	
2003	Mary Youngblood	Beneath the Raven Moon	Thomas Wasinger	Burning Sky – Spirit in the Wind; Redheart – Sacred Season; Vince Redhouse – Faith in the House; Randy Wood – Round Dance the Night Away	
2004	Black Eagle	Flying Free	Tom Bee	Tom Bee – Reveal His Glory; Black Lodge Singers – Brotherhood; R. Carlos Nakai – Sanctuary; Northern Cree – Still Rezin'	
2005	Bill Miller	Cedar Dream Songs	—N/a	Black Eagle – Straight Up Northern; Black Lodge Singers – Family Traditions; Joanne Shenandoah – Covenant; Mary Youngblood – Feed the Fire	
2006	Various artists	Sacred Ground: A Tribute to Mother Earth	Jim Wilson	Black Lodge – More Kids' Pow-Wow Songs; Alex E. Smith and Cheevers Toppah – Intonation: Harmonized Songs from the Southern Plains; Randy Wood – Our Love Will Never Die	
2007	Mary Youngblood	Dance with the Wind	Thomas Wasinger	Black Eagle – Voice of the Drum; Robert "Tree" Cody and Will Clipman – Heart of the Wind; Jana – American Indian Story; Northern Cree and Friends – Long Winter Nights	
2008	Johnny Whitehorse	Totemic Flute Chants	Larry Mitchell	Walter Ahhaitty and Friends – Oklahoma Style; Black Lodge – Watch This Dancer!; Davis Mitchell – The Ballad of Old Times; R. Carlos Nakai, Cliff Sarde, William Eaton, and Randy Wood – Reconnections	
2009	Various artists	Come to Me Great Mystery: Native American Healing Songs	Thomas Wasinger	Bryan Akipa – Songs from the Black Hills; Black Lodge – Spo'Mo'Kin'Nan; Northern Cree – Red Rock; Kevin Yazzie – Faith	
2010	Bill Miller	Spirit Wind North	Bill Miller; Michael Von Muchow	Michael Brant DeMaria – Siyotanka; Northern Cree – True Blue; John Two-Hawks – Wind Songs: Native American Flute Solos; Johnny Whitehorse – Riders of the Healing Road	
2011	Various artists	2010 Gathering of Nations Pow Wow: A Spirit's Dance	Derek Mathews; Lita Mathews; Melonie Mathews	Bear Creek – XI; Northern Cree – Temptations: Cree Round Dance Songs; Peter Phippen – Woodnotes Wyld: Historic Flute Sounds from the Dr. Richard W. Payne Collection	

^{^[I]} Each year is linked to the article about the Grammy Awards held that year.

== See also ==
- List of Grammy Award categories
- List of Native American musicians
