= The Rough Guide to Native American Music =

Compilation album by Various artists
- Released: 27 October 1998
- Genre: World, Native American
- Length: 67:18
- Label: World Music Network

Full series chronology
The Rough Guide to Cajun & Zydeco (1998)	The Rough Guide to Native American Music (1998)	The Rough Guide to Tango (1999)

The Rough Guide to Native American Music is a compilation album originally released in 1998. Part of the World Music Network Rough Guides series, the album features both traditional and modern Native American music ranging from canción ranchera to hardcore rap. Catherine Steinmann coordinated the project, Andrew Means wrote the liner notes, and Phil Stanton, co-founder of the World Music Network, produced and compiled the album. 2012's The Rough Guide to Native America is sometimes considered a second edition to this release.

== Critical reception ==
Professional ratings
Review scores
Source	Rating
Allmusic	4/5 stars

Alex Henderson of AllMusic praised the variety of the album, saying that while it's not the "last word" on Native American music, it is nonetheless "interesting" and "exciting". He considered Without Rezervation's call for an uprising on Track Ten especially compelling.

== Track listing ==
No.	Title	Artist	Length
1.	"Zuni Sunrise Song"	Chester Mahooty	2:25
2.	"Cherokee Morning Song"	Walela	4:31
3.	"Sacred Wind"	Sharon Burch	5:05
4.	"Healing Song"	Primeaux & Mike	3:23
5.	"Cuatro Vidas Polka"	Southern Scratch	4:09
6.	"Doazi Tumbi"	Judy Trejo	2:00
7.	"Basket Dance"	Garcia Brothers	6:34
8.	"Cleft in the Sky"	R. Carlos Nakai	3:02
9.	"White Buffalo"	Robert Tree Cody & Rob Wallace with Will Clipman	4:42
10.	"Are You Ready for W.O.R.?"	Without Rezervation	3:46
11.	"Kiowa Hymn"	Cornel Pewewardy & the Alliance West Singers	2:16
12.	"Tekanatsyaslitha"	Joanne Shenandoah	4:00
13.	"Victory Song"	Blackstone Singers	2:42
14.	"Mickey Mouse"	Black Lodge Singers	3:46
15.	"Many Flags"	R. Carlos Nakai & William Eaton with Black Lodge Singers	4:50
16.	"Native Funk"	Burning Sky	4:12
17.	"Sacred Mask Dance"	Ed Lee Natay	3:02
18.	"Wind Spirit"	Bill Miller	2:53
