= Gathering of Nations Pow Wow 1999 =

Compilation album

Compilation album by various artists
- Released: May 23, 2000
- Genre: Native American music
- Length: 61:26
- Label: Soar
- Producer: Douglas Spotted Eagle, Tom Bee (executive producer)

Professional ratings
Review scores
Source	Rating
Allmusic	4/5 stars

Gathering of Nations Pow Wow 1999 is a compilation album by various artists, released on May 23, 2000. The album features music from the annual event "Gathering of Nations Pow Wow" in Albuquerque, New Mexico. It contains live recordings from the 1999 event with 19 different drum groups from various Native American tribes. It received the Grammy Award for Best Native American Music Album in 2001, the first time this award was held. AllMusic recommends the album to anyone who is already a fan of powwow music, "simply because it is an exceptionally high quality recording."

== Track listing ==
1. "SR Girls Fancy" (Tribe) – 3:32
2. "Women's Cloth" (Wild Horse) – 3:36
3. "Tiny Tots" (Point) – 4:02
4. "Men's Grass" (Seekaskootch) – 3:42
5. "Boy's Northern Traditional" (Southern Cree) – 3:19
6. "Teen Girl's Fancy" (Clay) – 3:20
7. "Ladies Jingle" (Stoney Park) – 3:27
8. "Ladies Shawl" (The Boyz) – 3:12
9. "Girl's Jingle" (Eagle) – 3:31
10. "Ladies Cloth" (Springs) – 4:00
11. "Men's Grass" (High Noon) – 2:27
12. "Men's Norther Fancy" (Maskquaki Nation) – 3:04
13. "Boy's Fancy" (MGM) – 1:52
14. "Men's Northern Traditional" (Painted Horse) – 4:14
15. "Ladies Cloth" (Northern Cree Singers) – 3:09
16. "Teen Jingle" (Tribe) – 3:24
17. "Men's Grass" (Southern Cree) – 4:35
18. "Jr. Boy's Traditional" (Trailmix) – 2:52
19. "Teen Jingle" (Point) – 2:48

== Personnel ==
- Tom Bee – executive producer
- High Noon – performer
- Southern Cree – performer
- Douglas Spotted Eagle – engineer, sound mixer, producer
- Trailmix – performer
