= Mary Youngblood =

Native American flautist

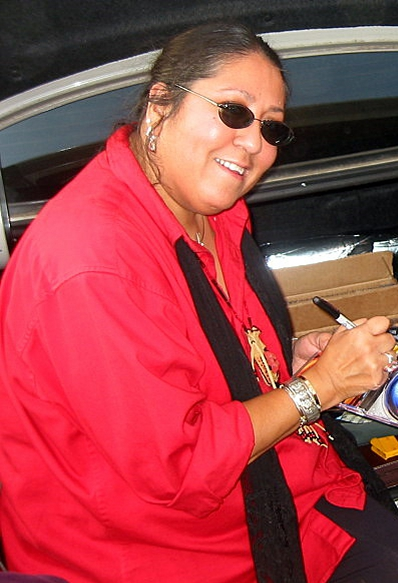
Mary Youngblood

Mary Youngblood is an American musician and performer of the Native American flute.

== Life and career ==
Mary Youngblood was born in Kirkland, Washington, and adopted as a child by a white couple, Dr. Bob and Leah Edwards, both educators.

She has been awarded three Native American Music Awards, being the first female artist to win "Flutist of the Year," which she won in both 1999 and 2000, as well as winning "Best Female Artist" in 2000. She is also the first Native American woman to have received a Grammy Award for "Best Native American Music Album", and the first Native American woman to have won two Grammys, the first for Beneath the Raven Moon in 2002 and Dance with the Wind in 2006.

In 2007 Mary Youngblood composed and played the flute music on the soundtrack for documentary film, "The Spirit of Sacajawea."

Ms. Youngblood is on the advisory board of the World Flute Society.

The Library of Congress maintains eight of Mary Youngblood's sound recordings.

== Discography ==
- Sacred Place: A Mary Youngblood Collection 2008, Silver Wave
- Dance with the Wind 2006, Silver Wave
- Feed the Fire 2004, Silver Wave
- Beneath the Raven Moon 2002, Silver Wave
- Heart of the World 1999, Silver Wave
- The Offering 1998, Silver Wave

== Sheet music ==
Three of her albums have been published as books of sheet music transcribed for Native American flute:

- The Offering
- Heart of the World
- Beneath the Raven Moon

Her work has been included in the following compilations and soundtracks:

- Voice of the Wind with Mary Youngblood & Michael Bayard (Live CD&DVD) 2016, Pure Motion Media
- My Mothers Garden by Singer-Songwriter Thea
- Bears with Joanne Shenandoah, Lawrence Laughing, Lyle Lovett, Alice Gomez, and Claude Carmichael
- Prayer for Peace featuring Michel Cusson, and with Mary Youngblood, Joanne Shenandoah
- Many Blessings: A Native American Celebration with Lawrence Laughing, Joanne Shenandoah, Alice Gomez, Robert Mirabal, Tito La Rosa, and Peter Kater
- Sacred Ground: A Tribute to Mother Earth with Robert Mirabal, Star Nayea, Bill Miller, Joanne Shenandoah, Little Wolf Band, and Walela
