= Jeff Ball (flautist) =

American flautist

Jeff Ball (born August 6, 1966 in Bethesda, Maryland) is a Native American flute player. He found the flute at a Powwow in Baltimore, Maryland in 1991. Although given some basic instruction by a Choctaw man named Wintamer, Ball is largely self-taught. His early inspiration came from R. Carlos Nakai and Douglas Spotted Eagle. In 1997, Ball was signed to the Red Feather Music label based in Arvada, Colorado. Ball's album's have received numerous nominations for the Native American Music Awards, winning the Native Heart award in 2001.

Ball records and travels with several musicians including his brother Randy Ball (bass guitar), Ted Natale (percussion, drum kit, Hang), John Natale (guitar), Barrie McLeod (guitar, piano), Sennen Quigley (guitar, piano), and Greg Dillon (guitar).

Guests on Ball's albums include Welela, Joseph Firecrow, Peter Phippen, Arvel Bird, and Douglas Spotted Eagle, Ron Kravitz.

== Discography ==
- Dancing with the Wind (Limited release demo cassette)
- Mixed-Blood
- Reverence
- Windtamer
- Cedar Moon (2001 NAMA Winner Native Heart)
- Prairie Runner
- Songs of Winter
- Return to Balance
- The Shape of Light (2007 ISMA Winner Best Flute Album)
- Ghost Town (Released March 28, 2009.)
- Secrets of a Crow
- Live
