= Jeff Ball =

Jeff Ball may refer to:

- Jeff Ball (baseball) (born 1969), former Major League Baseball first baseman
- Jeff Ball (flautist) (born 1966), Native American flute player
