= Wasinger =

Wasinger is a German surname. Notable people with this surname include:

- Barbara Wasinger, American politician
- Mark Wasinger (born 1961), American baseball player
- Tom Wasinger, American audio engineer and music producer
