= Come to Me Great Mystery: Native American Healing Songs =

Compilation album by Various artists
- Released: April 22, 2008
- Genre: Native American music
- Label: Silver Wave

Come to Me Great Mystery: Native American Healing Songs is a compilation album of Native American music released by Silver Wave Records on April 22, 2008. In 2009, the album won Tom Wasinger the Grammy Award for Best Native American Music Album.

== Track listing ==
1. "Come to Me Great Mystery", performed by Thirza Defoe – 7:21
2. "Hear My Prayer", performed by Doug Foote (a.k.a. Doug Good Feather) – 5:58
3. "Hue Hue", performed by Lorain Fox – 5:50
4. "Beauty Way", performed by Allen Mose – 6:59
5. "Calling to the People", performed by Thirza Defoe – 6:53
6. "I Am the Beginning and the End", performed by Dorothy Tsatoke – 6:53
7. "A Prayer from Above", performed by Doug Foote (a.k.a. Doug Good Feather) – 6:58
8. "Kaio Kaio", performed by Lorain Fox – 3:54

== Personnel ==
- Douglas Foote (a.k.a. Doug Good Feather) – composer
- James Marienthal – executive producer
- Allen Mose – composer
- Valerie Sanford – design
- Susan Wasinger – cover illustration
- Tom Wasinger – arranger, producer, engineer, mixing, photography, instrumentation
