= The Red Road (album) =

Studio album by Bill Miller
- Released: August 3, 1993
- Genre: Country music
- Length: 55:52
- Label: Warner Western
- Producer: Richard Bennett

Bill Miller chronology
Reservation Road - Live (1992)	The Red Road (1993)	Raven in the Snow (1995)

The Red Road is a 1993 country music album by Native American singer Bill Miller. The album was his major-label debut, with Warner Western, and brought him to a broader popular country music public. The album has been classed among classic country "drivers'" albums.

== Track listing ==
All tracks are written by Bill Miller, unless otherwise noted.

No.	Title	Writer(s)	Length
1.	"Dreams of Wounded Knee"		4:12
2.	"Praises"	Bill Miller, Myron Pyawasit	5:44
3.	"Two Hawks"		2:16
4.	"Reservation Road"	John Flanagan, Brent Holmes, Bill Miller	4:34
5.	"Tumbleweed"	Bill Miller, Peter Rowan	4:35
6.	"Faith of a Child"		6:55
7.	"Many Trails"		2:42
8.	"Trail of Freedom"	Bob Corbin, Bill Miller	4:51
9.	"Inter-Tribal Pow Wow Song"	Myron Pyawasit	2:30
10.	"Kokopelli's Journey"	Sam Bacco, David Hoffner, Bill Miller, Robert Mirabal	12:43
11.	"My People"	John Flanagan, Bill Miller	4:50

== Personnel ==
- David Angell - violin
- Sam Bacco - percussion
- Richard Bennett - guitar
- Mike Brignardello - bass
- John Catchings - cello
- Joe Chemay - bass
- Bob Corbin - vocal harmonies
- David Davidson - violin
- Dan Dugmore - steel guitar
- Jim Grosjean - viola
- David Hoffner - keyboards
- Mary Ann Kennedy - voices
- Robert Mirabal - flute, voices
- Dave Pomeroy - bass
- Pamela Rose - voices
- Bill Miller - flute, guitar, harmonica, percussion
