= Sacred Ground: A Tribute to Mother Earth =

Compilation album by Various artists
- Released: September 13, 2005
- Genre: Native American music
- Label: Silver Wave

Professional ratings
Review scores
Source	Rating
Allmusic	2.5/5 stars

Sacred Ground: A Tribute to Mother Earth is a compilation album of Native American music released through Silver Wave Records on September 13, 2005. In 2006, the album won Jim Wilson the Grammy Award for Best Native American Music Album.

== Track listing ==
1. "Sacred Ground", performed by Bill Miller – 6:20
2. "Can You Hear the Call", performed by Robert Mirabal – 6:36
3. "Mountain Song", performed by Star Nayea – 6:00
4. "Spirit Wind", performed by Bill Miller – 5:05
5. "Seeking Light", performed by Joanne Shenandoah – 6:13
6. "Raven", performed by Little Wolf Band – 5:43
7. "People of Yesterday", performed by Robert Mirabal – 5:00
8. "Prayers in the Wind", performed by Little Wolf Band – 4:06
9. "Let Us Dance" – 5:15
10. "Mother Earth", performed by Joanne Shenandoah, Walela – 4:49

== Personnel ==
- Walker Barnard – bass, bass guitar, programming, engineer
- David Carson – narrator, spoken word
- Mark Clark – percussion
- Priscilla Coolidge – vocals
- Rita Coolidge – vocals
- Dave Glasser – mastering
- Paul Groetzinger – drums
- James Marienthal – coordination, photography
- Johnny Mike – vocals
- Bill Miller – acoustic guitar, flute, guitar, vocals
- Robert Mirabal – flute, composer, vocals
- Star Nayea – vocals
- Verdell Primeaux – vocals
- Valerie Sanford – art producer
- Laura Satterfield – vocals
- Joanne Shenandoah – composer, vocals
- John Thomas – producer
- Walela – vocals
- Jim Wilson – bass, keyboards, programming, audio production
- Shane Wilson – composer, programming
- Ben Wright – electric guitar, e-bow
- Neil Young – composer
- Kevin Zornig – bass guitar, programming
