= Bless the People: Harmonized Peyote Songs =

Studio album by Verdell Primeaux and Johnny Mike
- Genre: Native American music
- Label: Canyon
- Producers: Giuli Doyle, Robert Doyle

Bless the People: Harmonized Peyote Songs is a studio album by Verdell Primeaux and Johnny Mike, released through Canyon Records in 2001. The album contains twenty original songs, grouped into five tracks of four songs each. For the album, Primeaux and Mike won the 2002 Grammy Award for Best Native American Music Album, and were nominated for Best Duo/Group of the Year and Best Traditional Recording at the 2002 Native American Music Awards.

== Track listing ==
1. "Four Harmonized Peyote Songs – 1" (8:46)
2. "Four Harmonized Peyote Songs – 2" (10:39)
3. "Four Harmonized Peyote Songs – 3" (5:17)
4. "Four Harmonized Peyote Songs – 4" (8:52)
5. "Four Harmonized Peyote Songs – 5" (8:32)
