= Da-Hong Seetoo =

Da-Hong Seetoo (simplified Chinese: 司徒 达宏; traditional Chinese: 司徒 達宏; pinyin: Sītú Dáhóng; born September 29, 1960) is a classical record producer, recording engineer, and Violinist. He has worked for the German classical record label, Deutsche Grammophon, and has recorded artists such as the Emerson String Quartet, Daniel Barenboim, Gil Shaham, David Finckel, Wu Han, and numerous others. Since the early 1980s and has won several Grammy Awards for his recordings.

== Childhood and early years ==
Seetoo began playing the violin at age two and a half. Seetoo's mother was a pianist and his father was a violinist who taught at the Shanghai Conservatory. He grew up during China's Cultural Revolution (1966–1976) and had to practice with the windows closed because Western music was forbidden. His father was able to purchase, at great expense, a Telefunken reel-to-reel hybrid tube and transistor based tape deck so he could copy any of the recordings that were circulated underground. “No one knew how to fix it, so I learned how to fix it myself. I was always interested in electronics. I built my first radio when I was seven years old,” he related.

He skipped the first four years of college, going directly to the Shanghai Conservatory where he was a violin prodigy. In 1979 he played for Boston Symphony concertmaster Joseph Silverstein who recommended him to the Curtis Institute of Music where he was admitted without a live audition. He studied with Ivan Galamian, graduated in 1984, and continued graduate studies at the Juilliard School of Music, studying with the legendary Dorothy DeLay. He became known for making audition tapes for students. “People knew I was always tinkering with recordings – it came naturally,” he said. He started a performance career after graduating from Juilliard, but found the lifestyle lonely and unsatisfying. After six months he was asked to fill in for a sick engineer who was recording Bach Partitas for violinist Eugene Drucker of the Emerson Quartet.

== Awards ==
- 2001 Grammy Award for Best Chamber Music Performance (joint winner) for the recording of Dmitri Shostakovich's complete string quartets.
- 2006 Grammy Award for Best Engineered Album, Classical for the recording of Felix Mendelssohn's complete string quartets.
