= The Rough Guide to Tango (1999 album) =

Compilation album by Various artists
- Released: 25 May 1999
- Genre: World, Tango
- Length: 66:31
- Label: World Music Network

Full series chronology
The Rough Guide to Native American Music (1999)	The Rough Guide to Tango (1999)	The Rough Guide to the Music of Japan (1999)

The Rough Guide to Tango is a world music compilation album originally released in 1999. Part of the World Music Network Rough Guides series, the album presents the tango music of Argentina with an eye toward the history of the genre, featuring 78 rpm recordings to tracks of the modern day. Teddy Peiro and Tom Andrews wrote the liner notes, and Phil Stanton—co-founder of the World Music Network—produced and compiled the album. This release was followed by a second edition a decade later.

== Critical reception ==
Professional ratings
Review scores
Source	Rating
Allmusic	4/5 stars

Alex Henderson of AllMusic called the album "far-reaching", demarcating within the tracks the "two types of tango: before and after Astor Piazzolla" (whose influence on the genre, he claimed, was comparable to that of Charlie Parker's on jazz).

== Track listing ==
No.	Title	Artist	Length
1.	"Aguafuertes Portenas"	Litto Nebbia	1:48
2.	"Tango de los Abuelos, los Padres y los Hijos"	Roberto Goyeneche	3:49
3.	"Afiche"	Adriana Varela	3:17
4.	"Tres Minutos con la Realidad"	Astor Piazzolla	3:05
5.	"El Bazar de los Juguetes"	Alberto Podestá	2:46
6.	"Cafe Homero"	Néstor Marconi	6:50
7.	"200 Años"	Agri, Binelli, & Fedel y Ferrer	1:54
8.	"Lilian"	Héctor Varela	3:10
9.	"Danzarin"	Leopoldo Federico & Roberto Grela	3:52
10.	"Cada Vez Que Me Recuerdes"	Adriana Varela	2:37
11.	"Melancolico Buenos Aires"	Astor Piazzolla	4:03
12.	"El Ultimo Guapo"	Alfredo Belusi	2:30
13.	"Orlando Goñi"	Aníbal Troilo	3:56
14.	"Caminito"	Carlos Gardel	2:37
15.	"Cuando Tu No Estas"	Néstor Marconi	5:45
16.	"Retrato de Nana"	Carlos Buono	3:08
17.	"El Tiempo Sera Testigo"	Héctor Varela	2:55
18.	"El Marne"	Eduardo Arolas	2:30
19.	"La Cumparsita"	Los Solistas d'Arienzo	2:45
20.	"Farol"	Virgilio Exposito	3:14
