= Roberto-Venn School =

Guitar construction school

Coordinates: 33.454876°N 112.086291°W

Roberto-Venn School of Luthiery
- Type: Private
- Established: 1975
- Location: Phoenix, Arizona, United States
- Website: www.roberto-venn.com

The Roberto-Venn School of Luthiery is a private, for-profit school focused on guitar repair and construction and located in Phoenix, Arizona. It has graduated over 1200 students in its over 35 years of operation.

== History ==
The idea for a guitar making school grew out of a 1968 Glendale Community College course in guitar making taught by Carl Samuels. This course led to an apprenticeship program that John Roberts started back in 1969 called the Juan Roberto Guitar Works. Before this, Roberts found himself in the jungles of Nicaragua, flying airplanes for a wood import company. Much of the rosewood and mahogany used at the school was collected with the help of the Miskito Indians and shipped to Phoenix, where Roberts began his guitar making endeavor. John Roberts died in the summer of 1999.

Robert Venn (1926–1991) joined with Roberts in 1973, and brought custom electric guitar making expertise to the guitar partnership. Venn was one a handful of guitar makers in the 1950s and 60's to wind his own pickups and use wooden pickup covers aesthetically matched with the highly figured hardwoods he used in the body and neck of his instruments. Venn built or repaired for fine guitarists such as Phil Baugh, Maurice Anderson, Tom Morrell, Bud Isaacs, Norm Hamlet, and Tiny Moore.

William Eaton apprenticed with John Roberts in 1971. He wrote a business plan for a guitar making school in 1974, while acquiring an MBA degree from the Stanford Graduate School of Business. The plan became the blueprint for the Roberto-Venn School of Luthiery, which Roberts, Venn, Eaton, and Bruce Scotten incorporated and founded in 1975. Eaton added new elements of stringed instrument design and innovations, creating multi-stringed, one-of-a-kind instruments at the school since 1976. Eaton is the director of Roberto-Venn School of Luthiery.
