= Dance with the Wind (album) =

Studio album by Mary Youngblood
- Released: May 23, 2006
- Genre: Native American music
- Label: Silver Wave

Mary Youngblood chronology
Feed the Fire (2004)	Dance with the Wind (2006)	Sacred Place: A Mary Youngblood Collection (2008)

Dance with the Wind is an album by Mary Youngblood, released through Silver Wave Records on May 23, 2006. In 2007, the album won Youngblood a Grammy Award for Best Native American Music Album.

== Track listing ==
All songs by Mary Youngblood, unless noted otherwise.

1. "Misty Rain" (Daub, Youngblood) – 3:55
2. "Wind Whispers" (Wasinger, Youngblood) – 3:27
3. "My Gypsy Soul" (Daub, Youngblood) – 3:22
4. "Play with Me" – 4:29
5. "Dance with Me" (Wasinger, Youngblood) – 3:00
6. "Find the Song" (Wasinger, Youngblood) – 4:32
7. "Lost Long Ago" (Daub, Youngblood) – 4:19
8. "Make an Offering" – 4:34
9. "Reach for the Sky" – 4:40
10. "Blood of My Blood" (Wasinger – 3:14
11. "On Our Journey" (Bensing, Youngblood) – 3:56
12. "Dance with the Wind" – 5:15

== Personnel ==
- Billy Bensing – composer
- Eric Levine – violin
- James Marienthal – piano, executive producer
- Mark McCoin – percussion, drums
- Jody Price – viola
- Valerie Sanford – design
- Larry Thompson – drums
- Ray Wasinger – drums
- Tom Wasinger – dulcimer, bass, guitar, mandolin, percussion, chimes, composer, drums, stick, zither, melodica, kora, producer, engineer, cittern, cimbalom, chamberlin, mixing, hand drums, cahones
- Mary Youngblood – flute, composer, flute (alto), vocals, poetry, producer, liner notes
