= Beneath the Raven Moon =

Studio album by Mary Youngblood
- Released: February 5, 2002
- Genre: International, Native American music, new-age
- Label: Silver Wave

Mary Youngblood chronology
Heart of the World (1999)	Beneath the Raven Moon (2002)	Feed the Fire (2004)

Beneath the Raven Moon is a studio album by Native American flautist Mary Youngblood, released in February 2002 through the record label Silver Wave. In 2003, the album earned Youngblood the Grammy Award for Best Native American Music Album.

== Composition ==
Allmusic described "Within My Heart" and "Dream with Me" as "straightforward Native compositions" and "Walk with Me" as having a "gentle, jazzy shuffle".

== Reception ==
Noting the fusion between Native American music with other genres, Allmusic said of the album: "Youngblood and her band mates manage to slip in and out of genres without losing their Native spirit, and doubtless attracting an ever-wider audience."

== Track listing ==
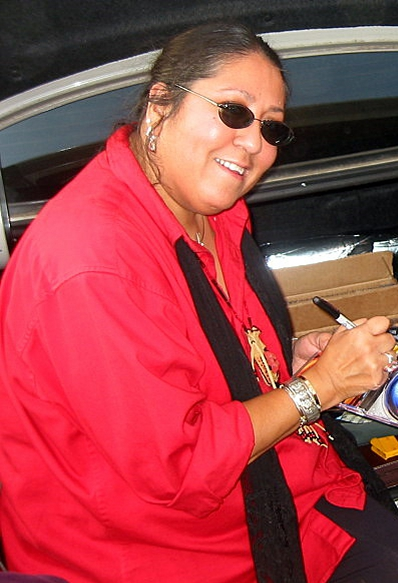
Mary Youngblood

No.	Title	Writer(s)	Length
1.	"Cama-I"	Mary Youngblood	4:07
2.	"Walk with Me"	Youngblood	3:55
3.	"Beneath the Raven Moon"	Youngblood	4:00
4.	"And We Shall Dance"	Youngblood	3:12
5.	"Laugh with Me"	Tom Wasinger	3:32
6.	"Caress the Smile"	Wasinger, Youngblood	4:17
7.	"Within My Heart"	Youngblood	3:14
8.	"And We Can Love"	Wasinger, Youngblood	3:38
9.	"Dream with Me"	Youngblood	6:11
10.	"Above the Mother Earth"	Youngblood	3:55
11.	"And We Will Fly"	Wasinger, Youngblood	3:40
12.	"Ipiluni (Be Happy, Aleut)"	Youngblood	2:32

Track listing adapted from Allmusic.

== Personnel ==
- Anne Beer – violin
- Tito la Rosa – quena
- James Marienthal – executive producer, piano
- Mark McCoin – drums, hand drums, percussion
- Valerie Sanford – cover art, design
- Ray Wasinger – drums
- Tom Wasinger – banjo, bass, berimbau, bowed zither, cajon, chamberlin, cittern, guitar, hand drums, keyboards, lap steel guitar, mandolin, marxophone, mountain dulcimer, mouth bow, percussion, producer, string arrangements, ukulele, zither
- Mary Youngblood – Celtic flute, flute, Native American flute, poetry, producer, vocals, wood flute

Credits adapted from Allmusic.
