= Sharon Burch =

American singer

Sharon Burch of Navajo and German origin is a founding advisor of First Nations Composer Initiative. Sharon Burch is an organizer, composer, teacher of general music, author of educational music-books, singer (English and Navajo language) besides being a recording artist.

== Life ==
Born to a Navajo mother and a German father, Burch was raised in the traditional Navajo culture in New Mexico and spoke only the Navajo language until she began school. After finishing high school in California, she attended Navajo Community College in Tsaile, Arizona and later the University of New Mexico.

Burch's music is the contemporary expression of traditional Navajo ways and living. Many of her songs are in Navajo language and capture the sacredness of Mother Earth, Father Sun and the importance of family and place to the Diné.

Burch's third album, “Touch the Sweet Earth” (published on Harmony Ridge) was awarded the 1995 INDIE Award in the "North American Native Music" category. Burch performs regularly at folk festivals, fairs, schools, universities and has appeared in concert at the Kennedy Center and the Smithsonian in Washington D.C., the Palace of Fine Arts in San Francisco, and the Heard Museum in Phoenix. Burch has also performed in Japan [ref].

In 1998, Burch performed a concert at the 32nd Smithsonian Folklife Festival at the National Mall, Washington D.C.

== Discography ==
Albums

- The Blessing Ways (1984) (with A. Paul Ortega)
- Yazzie girl (1989)
- Touch The Sweet Earth (1995)
- Colors of My Heart (1999) (P)(C) Canyon Records 1999 CR-536

Contributing artist

- The Rough Guide to Native American Music (1999) World Music Network

Books

- Beyond the Books Hal Leonard Corporation (July 1, 2011) Language: English ISBN 1458403580 ISBN 978-1458403582
