= Land (Robert Mirabal album) =

Studio album by Robert Mirabal
- Released: 1995
- Label: Warner Western
- Producers: Mike Wanchic, Reno Kling

Robert Mirabal chronology
Song Carrier (1995)	Land (1995)	Warrior Magician (1996)

Land is an album by the Native American musician Robert Mirabal, released in 1995. The album originated as a score for a dance piece by Eiko & Koma, which was first performed in 1991. It was nominated for a First Americans in the Arts award. Mirabal and Eiko & Koma adapted part of the score for later productions.

== Production ==
Produced in part by Mike Wanchic, Land was recorded in Bloomington, Indiana, in a week. Mirabal wrote the score; he sang and played flute and his cousin Reynaldo Lujan sang and played drums. Land is about surviving in a harsh terrain.

== Critical reception ==
Professional ratings
Review scores
Source	Rating
AllMusic	4.5/5 stars
MusicHound World: The Essential Album Guide	3/5 stars

The Santa Fe New Mexican wrote that "Mirabal is bringing much-deserved attention to the Native American flute, an instrument with shrill and lonesome tones that is capable of expressing as much emotion in its gentle way as any European woodwind." Tulsa World deemed the album "a fascinating work of simple, earthen music," writing that "both movements of 'Eikos Shaman' are heart-racing dances; the first movement builds a crescendo so effectively, you may rise from your chair unwillingly." The Pittsburgh Post-Gazette praised the "haunting score, at once contemporary and Native American timeless."

AllMusic called Land "a splendid album from Robert Mirabal, here devoting himself to the traditional in terms of performance—the focus is less on flute than on drum and voice."

== Track listing ==
No.	Title	Length
1.	"Isidro's Song"
2.	"Yuta's Song"
3.	"Eikos Shaman"
4.	"Moonlight Song"
5.	"Eikos Shaman – Reprise"
6.	"Extinction"
7.	"White Buffalo"
8.	"Masa-Yumé"
