= Cedar Dream Songs =

Studio album by Bill Miller
- Released: April 20, 2004
- Genre: Native American music
- Label: Paras Recordings

Cedar Dream Songs is an album by Bill Miller, released through Paras Recordings on April 20, 2004. In 2005, the album won Miller the Grammy Award for Best Native American Music Album.

== Track listing ==
1. "Unspoken Prayer" (Bill Miller, Joshua Yudkin) – 5:33
2. "Faith of Fire" (Miller, Yudkin) – 5:15
3. "Prophecy" (Miller, Yudkin) – 3:33
4. "Pathway to Dreams" (Miller, Yudkin) – 6:44
5. "Blood Brothers" (Miller, Yudkin) – 2:15
6. "Sacred Ground" (Miller, Yudkin) – 5:24
7. "Birds of the Air" (Miller, Yudkin) – 7:54
8. "Peace Offering" (Miller) – 3:20
9. "Calling the Rain" (Miller) – 5:36

== Personnel ==
- Charlie Lico – executive producer
- Bill Miller – flute, guitar, percussion, composer, vocals, producer, paintings, audio production
- Terry Nirva – percussion
- Michael Page – art direction
- Jim Snowden – executive producer
- Michael Von Muchow – bass guitar
- Joshua Yudkin – composer, keyboards
