= Raven in the Snow =

Studio album by Bill Miller
- Released: 1995
- Label: Reprise
- Producer: Richard Bennett

Bill Miller chronology
The Red Road (1993)	Raven in the Snow (1995)	Native Suite: Chants, Dances, and the Sacred Earth (1996)

Raven in the Snow is an album by the Native American musician Bill Miller, released in 1995. The first two singles were "River of Time" and the title track. Miller supported the album by opening shows for the BoDeans and then Tish Hinojosa.

== Production ==
Produced by Richard Bennett, the album was recorded in Nashville. "In Every Corner of the Forest" is a three-part instrumental that was inspired by a Mike Watt/Eddie Vedder show; much of the rest of the album was influenced by the Byrds and Richie Havens. Miller played flute on Raven in the Snow, and was supported by an electric band on most of the songs. Miller wrote many of the songs with members of his backing band. Miller chose the album's rock sound in part due to commercial considerations.

== Critical reception ==
Professional ratings
Review scores
Source	Rating
AllMusic	4.5/5 stars
The Encyclopedia of Popular Music	3/5 stars
MusicHound World: The Essential Album Guide	4/5 stars
USA Today	3/4 stars

USA Today called the "rocking" Raven in the Snow "one of the most powerful and poetic releases of the year." The Vancouver Sun wrote: "From Dylan-esque harp leads to crunching, spellbinding backbeats, Miller combines the best of all worlds to come up with straightforward folk-rock with a little something extra." City Pages considered the album "an uncategorizable mix of smart Triple-A pop and meditative tribal rhythms, with strong echoes of Dylan's best '70s stuff."

The Record labeled the album "a multi-faceted musical masterpiece," writing that the songs "are fresh and crackle with fine, crisp musicianship." The Plain Dealer determined that Miller's music "isn't prefabricated and delves into important and uncomfortable themes concerning America's treatment of its native people." The Mercury News listed Raven in the Snow among the best albums of 1995.

AllMusic deemed "River of Time" "a harmonica-driven, midtempo rocker that compares favorably with the music of artists like Peter Himmelman."

== Track listing ==
No.	Title	Length
1.	"River of Time"
2.	"Brave Heart"
3.	"In Every Corner of the Forest (Part 1)"
4.	"Listen to Me"
5.	"Red Bird, Yellow Sun"
6.	"After the Storm"
7.	"Raven in the Snow"
8.	"Pile of Stones"
9.	"In Every Corner of the Forest (Part 2)"
10.	"The Final Word"
11.	"Eagle Must Fly Free"
12.	"This Kind of Love"
13.	"In Every Corner of the Forest (Part 3)"
