= Flying Free =

Studio album by Black Eagle
- Released: March 9, 2004
- Recorded: July 2002
- Genre: Native American music
- Length: 54:43
- Label: Soar
- Producer: Tom Bee

Black Eagle chronology
Life Goes On (2002)	Flying Free (2004)	Straight Up Northern (2005)

Professional ratings
Review scores
Source	Rating
Allmusic	4/5 stars

Flying Free is the fourth studio album by Native American band Black Eagle, released on March 9, 2004 and recorded in July 2002. It received the Grammy Award for Best Native American Music Album in 2004.

== Track listing ==
1. "Flying Free" (Yepa) – 3:37
2. "Dancing Colors" (Yepa) – 5:14
3. "The Beautiful Dance" (Yepa) – 5:39
4. "Flight of the Eagle" (Tosa) – 3:43
5. "Running Strong (Jam On!)" (Romero) – 4:38
6. "Prepare Yourself to Dance" (Yepa) – 6:05
7. "Get Up Dance With a Good Heart" (Yepa) – 7:05
8. "Beautiful Jingle Dancer" (Yepa) – 3:36
9. "(Singing in the Circle)" (Yepa) – 3:55
10. "Katesi Tekakwitha" (Yepa) – 5:39
11. "The Eagle" (Yepa) – 3:01
12. "From the Heart" (Yepa) – 4:51

== Personnel ==
- Antonio Blue Eyes – performer
- Tom Bee – sound mixing, producer
- Kendrick Casiquito – performer
- Francois Charron – graphic designer
- Isaiah "Roswell" Chinana – performer
- Cheryl Chinznz – performer
- Douglas Geist – engineer
- J. Douglas Geist – engineer
- Eric Larson – mastering
- Shawn Romero – composer
- David Yepa, Jr. – composer
- Malcom Yepa – composer
