= Black Lodge Singers =

Native American northern drum group

The Black Lodge Singers of White Swan, Washington are a Native American northern drum group led by Kenny ScabbyRobe, of the Blackfeet Nation. The Black Lodge Singers are largely drawn from his twelve sons. They have released twenty albums for Canyon Records, including two albums of pow wow songs for children.

== Discography ==
Contributing artist

- The Rough Guide to Native American Music (1998, World Music Network)

== Awards ==
The Black Lodge Singers won the Native American Music Awards of several occasions, including 1998 Best Powwow Album, 2000 Debut Group, and 2004 Best Powwow Music. In collaboration with R. Carlos Nakai and William Eaton, they were nominated for the 1994 Grammy Award for Best Traditional Folk Album for Ancestral Voices. Between 2001 and 2009, they were nominated for the Grammy Award for Best Native American Music Album on seven occasions. In 2021, they received their first nomination in eleven years in the Best Regional Roots Music Album category, which was formed in 2013.
