= Shemekia Copeland =

American blues singer (b. 1979)

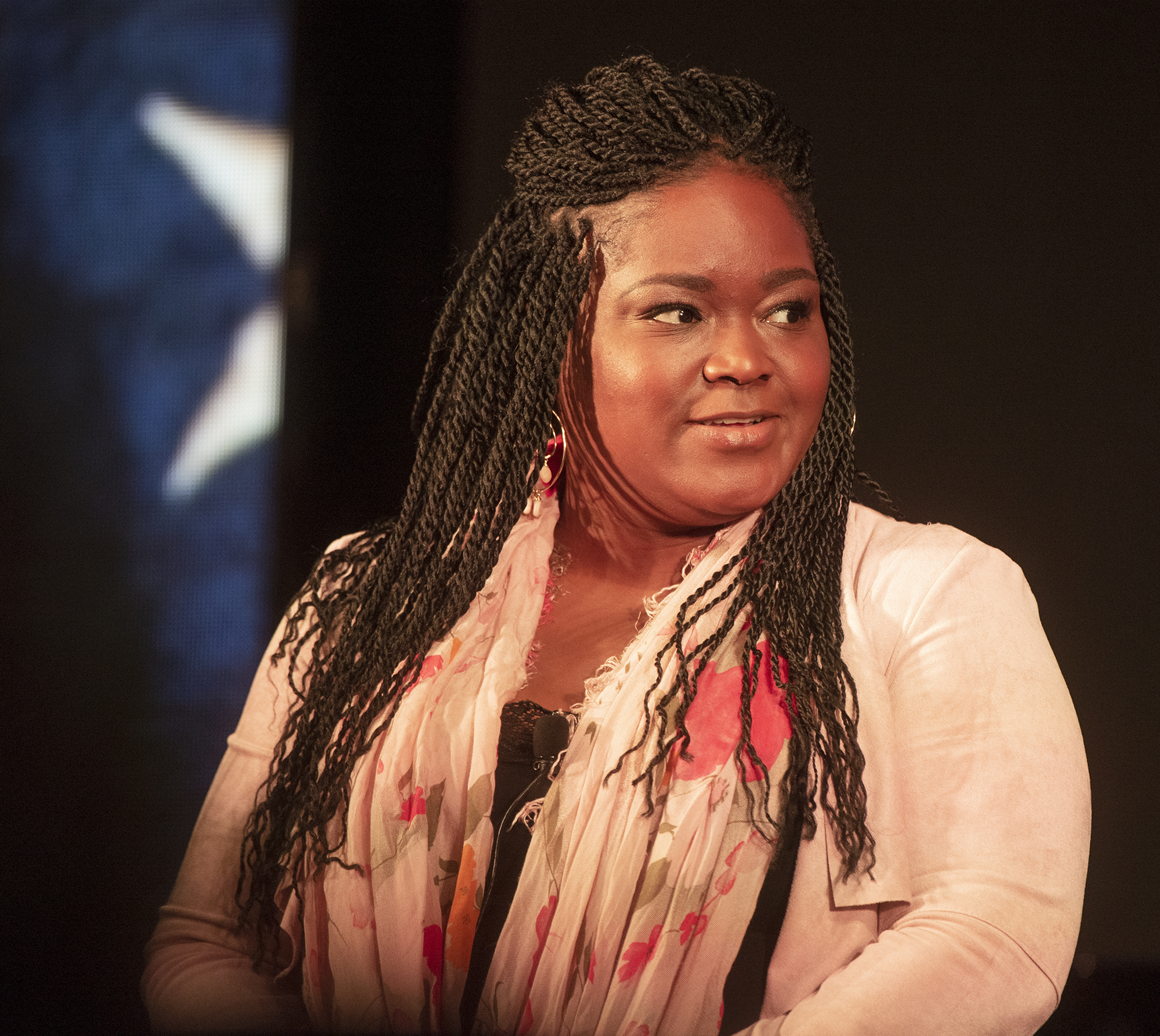
- Copeland at the 2019 Summit on Race

Background information
- Born: Charon Shemekia Copeland; April 10, 1979 (age 47); New York City, U.S.
- Genres: Electric blues, gospel, R&B
- Occupation: Singer
- Instrument: Vocals
- Years active: 1996–present
- Labels: Alligator Records, Telarc (2008–2012)
- Website: ShemekiaCopeland.com

Charon Shemekia Copeland (born April 10, 1979) is an American electric blues vocalist. She has released 12 albums, won nine Blues Music Awards, and won five Blues Blast Music Awards. In 2024, Copeland received nominations at the 67th Annual Grammy Awards for Best American Roots Performance, Best American Roots Song, and Best Contemporary Blues Album.

== Early life ==
Copeland was born in Harlem, New York City, United States. She is the daughter of Texas blues guitarist and singer Johnny Copeland. She began singing at an early age and her first public performance was at the Cotton Club when she was about 10. Copeland graduated in 1997 from Teaneck High School in Teaneck, New Jersey.

== Career ==
In 1998, Copeland landed a recording contract with Alligator Records, which issued her debut album, Turn the Heat Up!. Her second album, Wicked, was released in 2000 and featured a duet with Ruth Brown. It earned her three Blues Music Awards.

The follow-up record, Talking to Strangers, was produced by Dr. John, and in 2005 she released The Soul Truth, produced by Steve Cropper.

In 2008, Copeland signed with Telarc International, and released her first album, Never Going Back, with that label in February 2009. The album was nominated for Best Contemporary Blues Recording at the Blues Blast Music Awards. She won the Rising Star - Blues Artist in the DownBeat Critics Poll announced in the December 2009 issue.

In 2010, Copeland was nominated for Best Female Blues Artist at the Blues Blast Music Awards.

On June 12, 2011 at the Chicago Blues Festival, she was presented Koko Taylor's crown and officially given the honor as the "New Queen of the Blues" by Koko Taylor's daughter, Cookie Taylor.

In 2013, Copeland was nominated for Contemporary Blues Female Artist at the Blues Music Awards. The same year, she received her second nomination for Best Female Blues Artist at the Blues Blast Music Awards.

In October 2015, her album Outskirts of Love peaked at number 6 on the Billboard Top Blues Albums chart. In 2016, she won both the Blues Music Award for Contemporary Blues Female Artist and the Blues Blast Music Award for Best Female Blues Artist. In 2017, she participated in the Mahindra Blues Festival in Mumbai.

In August 2018, her next album, America's Child, entered at number 3 on the Billboard Top Blues Albums chart. The album won both the Album of the Year and Contemporary Album of the Year titles at the Blues Music Awards in 2019. The same year, Copeland received four Blues Blast Music Award nominations, for Album of the Year, Contemporary Blues Album, Contemporary Female Blues Artist, and Instrumentalist - Vocals.

In May 2020, Copeland won her second Blues Music Award for Contemporary Blues Female Artist of the Year. She won the awards for Contemporary Blues Album and Female Blues Artist at the Blues Blast Music Awards in 2021.

In July 2022, she won the award for Blues Artist of the Year at the annual DownBeat Critics Poll. She released her tenth studio album, Done Come Too Far, on August 19, 2022 In 2023, Copeland won the Instrumentalist - Vocals category at the Blues Music Awards. She also picked up two Blues Blast Music Awards, in the Best Female Blues Artist and Best Vocals categories.

In December 2024, Copeland was nominated for a Grammy Award for Best American Roots Performance and a Grammy Award for Best American Roots Song. Her album Blame it on Eve was also nominated for a Grammy Award for Best Contemporary Blues Album.

On March 19, 2025, Copeland's Blame it on Eve was nominated for a Libera Award for Blues Record. On July 7, 2025, Copeland was nominated for another Blues Blast Music Award in the Female Blues Artist category. Copeland won the award on September 20, 2025.

== Personal life ==
Copeland resides in the San Diego area. She lives with her husband Brian Schultz, and her son Johnny (who is named after Copeland’s father).

== Discography ==
- 1998: Turn the Heat Up (Alligator ALCD-4857)
- 2000: Wicked (Alligator ALCD-4875)
- 2002: Talking to Strangers (Alligator ALCD-4887)
- 2005: The Soul Truth (Alligator ALCD-4905)
- 2009: Never Going Back (Telarc CD-83692)
- 2011: Shemekia Copeland - Deluxe Edition (Alligator ALCD-5614) - compilation
- 2012: 33 ⅓ (Telarc/Concord TEL-33199)
- 2015: Outskirts of Love (Alligator ALCD-4966)
- 2018: America's Child (Alligator ALCD-4984)
- 2020: Uncivil War (Alligator ALCD-5001)
- 2022: Done Come Too Far (Alligator ALCD-5010)
- 2024: Blame it on Eve (Alligator ALCD-5022)
