= Bill Miller (musician, born 1955) =

American singer-songwriter

Bill Miller (born January 23, 1955) is an American singer/songwriter and artist. He is a guitarist, player of the Native American flute and painter.

== Life ==
Bill Miller was born on the Stockbridge-Munsee reservation, near Shawano in northern Wisconsin. His Mohican name is Fush-Ya Heay Aka (meaning "bird song"). He began playing guitar when he was 12 years old. In 1973, he moved to Milwaukee and won an art school scholarship to Layton School of Art, later attending University of Wisconsin at LaCrosse.

In 1984, he moved to Nashville. His biggest break came when popular musician Tori Amos, after listening to his Red Road CD on her tour bus, asked him to serve as the opening act on her Under the Pink tour. Miller continuously gained fans with other artists from a broad musical spectrum. He went on to tour with diverse musicians such as Pearl Jam's Eddie Vedder, The BoDeans, Richie Havens, John Carter Cash, and Arlo Guthrie and wrote songs with artists such as Nanci Griffith, Peter Rowan and Kim Carnes.

In 1995, Miller's flute playing was featured on the Vanessa Williams song “Colors of the Wind”, the theme song on soundtrack of Disney’s Pocahontas, which won a Grammy Award and both the Academy Award and Golden Globe Award for Best Original Song.

Miller has collaborated with other Native American musicians such as Robert Mirabal, Carlos Nakai, and Joanne Shenandoah. His project with Mirabal, Native Suite was an experimental and traditional project, featuring flute and percussion, as well as Mohican pow-wow singing. His vocals appeared on Thomas Kinkade's 2000 album Music of Light which featured Rob Mathes and Australian Michelle Tumes; he also was featured on Cherokee singer-songwriter Jason Upton's album Great River Road.

In early 2008, Miller worked on a project in La Crosse, Wisconsin for The Pump House, a regional arts center. Miller painted one of many 6-foot-tall (1.8 m) herons that were auctioned off and placed around the city in honor of fine arts. In April 2008, his symphony, "The Last Stand" was performed as world premiere by the La Crosse Symphony Orchestra with Amy Mills conducting, along with Native American musicians and dancers. The symphony was inspired from Miller's visit of the Battle of the Little Bighorn site, when he was nine years old. Called a "symphony of hope", it deals with that battle and the reconciliation which Miller, feels must still occur and composed with Joshua Yudkin and Kristin Wilkinson.

== Themes ==
In an interview, Miller said, "I appreciate people who have something to stand up for. I stand up for the truth. If you stand up for what you believe in you have no idea how many people you'll affect."

Miller's songs have been deeply spiritual and have explored his Christian faith in his indigenous language; his albums Spirit Rain and his 2000 record, Hear Our Prayer, released by Integrity Music as a Christian worship music project exemplify this dialog. While some songs were co-written by songwriters in the genre, he re-recorded familiar songs such as "Praises" from The Red Road and "Listen to Me" from Raven in the Snow which, in a new context made clear that he could be fully Native and Christian. Notable cuts on the album were his cover of Bob Dylan's "I Believe in You" and a reinterpretation of the spiritual "Ain't Gonna Let Nobody Turn Me 'Round."

== Awards ==
Miller has won three Grammy Awards, numerous Native American Music Awards, including a Lifetime Achievement Award. In 2005, Miller's instrumental Cedar Dream Songs won a Grammy Award for Best Native American Music Album.

== Discography ==
Albums

- Bill Miller and Native Sons (1983, Windspirit)
- Old Dreams and New Hopes (1987, Windspirit)
- The Art of Survival (1990, Vanguard)
- Loon, Mountain And Moon (1991, Vanguard)
- Reservation Road - Live (1992, Vanguard)
- The Red Road (1993, Warner Western)
- Raven in the Snow (1995, Reprise/Warner Bros.)
- Native Suite: Chants, Dances, and the Sacred Earth with Robert Mirabal (1996, Warner Western)
- Ghostdance (1999, Vanguard)
- Healing Waters (1999, JVO Records; 2001 Good Cop Bad Cop)
- Hear our Prayer (2000, Integrity)
- Spirit Rain (2002, Paras)
- A Sacred Gift (2003, Paras)
- Cedar Dream Songs (2004, Paras)
- Spirit Songs: The Best of Bill Miller (2004, Vanguard)
- Spirit Wind North (2009, Cool Springs Music Group)
- Spirit Wind East (2010, Cool Springs Music Group)
- Chronicles of Hope (2010, Cool Springs Music Group)
- Stone Tree (2021)

Contributing artist

- Disney's Pocahontas Soundtrack with Vanessa Williams (1995)
- The Rough Guide to Native American Music (1999, World Music Network)
- Look Again To The Wind: Johnny Cash's Bitter Tears Revisited (2015, Sony Masterworks)
