= Wicked (Shemekia Copeland album) =

Studio album by Shemekia Copeland
- Released: 2000
- Genre: Blues
- Label: Alligator
- Producer: Bruce Iglauer, John Hahn, Jimmy Vivino

Shemekia Copeland chronology
Turn the Heat Up (1998)	Wicked (2000)	Talking to Strangers (2002)

Wicked is the second album by the American blues singer Shemekia Copeland, released in 2000. It peaked at No. 8 on Billboard's Blues Albums chart. Wicked was nominated for a Grammy Award for "Best Contemporary Blues Album". It won a W. C. Handy Award for "Blues Album of the Year". Copeland supported the album by touring with B. B. King.

== Production ==
Copeland spent three weeks recording Wicked. Nine of the songs were cowritten by John Hahn, who also coproduced the album with Bruce Iglauer and Jimmy Vivino. She duetted with Ruth Brown on "If He Moves His Lips". "Beat Up Guitar" is a tribute to Copeland's father, Johnny Copeland. "It's My Own Tears" was written by Johnny. The Uptown Horns contributed to "Up on 1-2-5". Sugar Blue played a harmonica solo on "It's 2 A.M.".

== Critical reception ==
Professional ratings
Review scores
Source	Rating
AllMusic	4/5 stars
Robert Christgau	(1-star Honorable Mention)
The Gazette	4/5 stars
Los Angeles Times	3/4 stars
The Penguin Guide to Blues Recordings	4/4 stars
Pittsburgh Post-Gazette	3/4 stars

The Globe and Mail wrote that Copeland "has the kind of burly blues voice that used to make the juke joints shake when Bessie Smith was still singing about a pig's foot and a bottle of beer." The Austin Chronicle concluded: "Her band is solid, the production smart, the song selection suitably diverse, but the story here is Copeland's undeniable presence, reflecting a confidence that belies her young age." Robert Christgau praised "Steamy Windows" and "If He Moves His Lips".

The Chicago Tribune noted that "the conventional band, and blues-cliche songwriters such as John Hahn, can't find the right connection." The Gazette called Copeland "an extremely powerful singer... She can shake the rafters." The Los Angeles Times opined that "Wicked is the kind of standard-issue showcase that labels such as Alligator have been churning out for decades, but that's not necessarily a bad thing."

AllMusic wrote that "Copeland continues to prove herself as one of the strongest young talents in the blues."

== Track listing ==
No.	Title	Length
1.	"It's 2 A.M."
2.	"Not Tonight"
3.	"Love Scene"
4.	"The Other Woman"
5.	"Whole Lotta Water"
6.	"Beat Up Guitar"
7.	"Miss Hy Ciditty"
8.	"Up on 1-2-5"
9.	"Wild, Wild Woman"
10.	"The Fool You're Looking For"
11.	"If He Moves His Lips"
12.	"Steamy Windows"
13.	"It's My Own Tears"
