= Veterans Songs =

Studio album by Lakota Thunder
- Released: 2000
- Genre: American Indian
- Length: 50:05
- Label: Makoché
- Producer: David Swenson

Lakota Thunder chronology
Veterans Songs (2000)	Way of Life (2004)

Veterans Songs is the first studio album by the American Indian drum group Lakota Thunder. Recorded in Bismarck, North Dakota, Veterans Songs is meant to "honor warriors from the past to the present." The liner notes include a quote from Sitting Bull: "I was never the aggressor, I only fought to protect the children."

It was nominated for the first Grammy for Best Native American Music Album, in 2001. It won Best Historical Recording at the Native American Music Awards.

== Track listing ==
1. "Sitting Bull's Memorial Song" – 4:58
2. "In a Sacred Manner I Come" – 4:15
3. "Palani Olowan" – 4:15
4. "Pehin Hanska Okicize Olowan" – 4:13
5. "No Heart" – 2:21
6. "Mila Hanska Ceya Natan Pelo" – 3:12
7. "Lakota Hoksila" – 3:22
8. "I Belong to the Long Knives" – 4:27
9. "Flag Song/WW I Veterans Song" – 5:28
10. "Six Islands" - 2:28
11. "WW II Veterans Song" - 3:43
12. "Korea Veterans Song" - 3:27
13. "Veterans Song" - 4:02

== Personnel ==
- Courtney Yellow Fat
- Dana Yellow Fat
- Wyman Archambault
- Wade Claymore Sr.
- Frank Bullhead
- Kenny Bullhead
- Reuben Fasthorse
- John Gamiochipi
- Carlos Picotte
- Joe Picotte
- Leo Standing Crow
- Virgil Taken Alive
- Kristian Theisz
