= Tom Bee =

American musician

Tom Bee (November 8, 1941 - July 25, 2024) was the CEO and founder of Sound of America Records (SOAR), the first Native American owned record label.

== Childhood ==
Born on November 8, 1941, in Gallup, New Mexico, Bee was adopted at birth and raised in the reservation border town of Gallup, near the Navajo Nation. Growing up, Bee would experience the foundations of rock and roll at a local armory where artists such as Little Richard, Buddy Holly and Fats Domino would perform. After the age of 15, Bee would begin to travel to California where he would eventually begin his music career.

== XIT ==
Best known as founder and featured artist with the popular 1970s music group XIT, Bee's composition "(We've Got) Blue Skies" was recorded by Michael Jackson and The Jackson 5 on their worldwide hit album "Maybe Tomorrow." This led to an artist, writer, and producer contract with Motown Records, making XIT the first native American band to sign to a major label. While under contract with Motown, XIT released two widely acclaimed albums entitled "Plight of the Redman" and "Silent Warrior." A single from the latter album entitled "Reservation of Education" went on to become a top 5 selling record in France and other European countries in 1973. The political overtones of Bee's lyrics kept them from ever achieving superstar status in the United States, but the group developed a cult status in America and Europe, which has allowed their music to survive for the last thirty years.

In fact, one major newspaper once wrote, "These guys are to the Indians like the Beatles were to the White folks." Amid a legion of loyal fans throughout the world, their live stage presentations drew comparisons by the media to the raw energy of the Rolling Stones. While at Motown, Bee also wrote and produced the title song "Joyful Jukebox Music" for Michael Jackson's Swan Song album on the label. He also worked with Smokey Robinson on his first solo album "Smokey." In 1979, one of his compositions "Red Hot" was a top Billboard dance hit by Taka Boom (Chaka Khan's sister), and in 1985, U.K. Rockabilly sensation Shakin' Stevens recorded Bee's "Don't Be Two Faced" on his highly successful album, "The Bop Won't Stop."

In 2002, the band would hold a concert celebrating 30 years since the band's creation at Mystic Lake. The group would then release an accompanying live album called "Without Reservation (Live)"

== Sound of America Records ==
Through the years Bee's compositions have appeared on numerous other albums and special projects as well. In 1989, Bee formed Sound of America Records (SOAR), in the garage of his home. In 1995, Bee formed yet another company, SOAR Distribution LTD for the sole purpose of providing his clients with one-stop music from other independent labels and artists also producing Native American music. In 1999, SOAR purchased all three buildings that they had been leasing since 1991 to house their labels, publishing, and studio operations. SOAR was also enlisted as the exclusive Native American distributor for the Robbie Robertson records "Music for the Native Americans" and "Contact From the Underworld of Redboy," on Capitol Records, and the multi-million seller "Sacred Spirit" on Virgin Records. SOAR comprises three publishing companies and five different labels; SOAR, Natural Visions, Warrior, Dakotah, and Red Sea. SOAR now has over 300 quality titles of both contemporary and traditional music. Bee has said all along that SOAR was not the first company to record Native American music, but they were the first to take it to the next level. SOAR was, however, the first company to release traditional Native American music on compact disc. He was once quoted as saying "we took Native American music out of the trading posts and into the streets." SOAR's motto has always been "Quality titles, not quantity of titles."

== Awards ==
Bee's radical efforts over a ten-year period helped in persuading NARAS to finally create a Native American Folk category in the Grammy's. Besides numerous gold albums, Bee has received many awards, including the Eagle Spirit in 1994 from the American Film Institute in San Francisco and The Will Sampson Award in 1996 from the First Americans in the Arts. In 1998, Bee received the Producer of the Year Award from the First Annual Native American Music Awards (NAMMY's). The following year he received the NAMMY's Lifetime Achievement Award (1999). In 2001, Bee received a Grammy as Producer for Best Native American Music Album in the category's inaugural year.

Mayor Martin Chavez, of the City of Albuquerque, proclaimed July 27, 2002 to be "Tom Bee Day," in recognition of Bee's accomplishments within the music industry as a recording artist, songwriter, record producer and multi-award winner. On February 8, 2003, Bee received the Lifetime Achievement Award from First Americans In The Arts in Beverly Hills, Ca. Most recently, on February 19, 2003, in New York City, Bee received the Lifetime Achievement Award from Four Directions Entertainment. Recent achievements include a 2004 Grammy nomination for his album "Reveal His Glory." Bee won a Grammy for producing the 2004 Grammy winning record "Flying Free" by Black Eagle.
