= Stephen Johns (music producer) =

British classical music producer

- Genres: Classical music

Stephen Johns is a British classical music producer. He is currently the artistic director at the Royal College of Music in London, England.

Johns has won numerous awards, including four Grammy Awards.
