= Robert Mirabal =

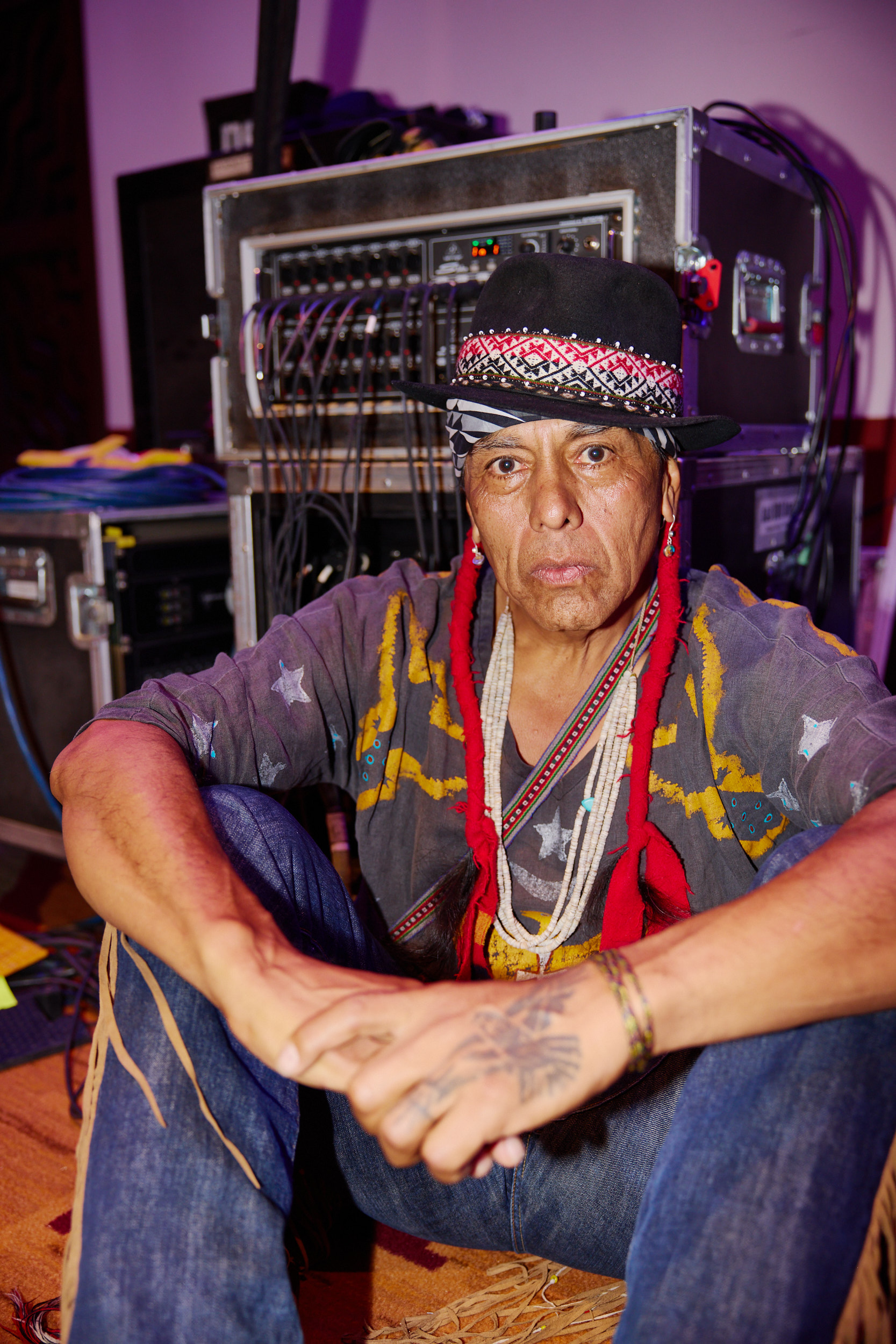

Background information
- Origin: Taos Pueblo, New Mexico
- Genres: Native American music, New Mexico music, World music
- Label: Warner Western
- Website: www.robertmirabal.com

Robert Mirabal (b. 1966) is a Pueblo musician and Native American flute player and maker from Taos Pueblo, New Mexico, United States.

His flutes are world-renowned and have been displayed at the Smithsonian Institution's Museum of the American Indian. An award-winning musician and leading proponent of world music, Mirabal performs worldwide, sharing flute songs, tribal rock, dance, and storytelling.

Mirabal was twice named the Native American Music Awards' Artist of the Year, and received the Songwriter of the Year award three times. He was featured in Grammy Award winning album, Sacred Ground: A Tribute to Mother Earth in 2006 for Best Native American Music Album

Mirabal also published a book of storytelling poetry and prose in 1994 entitled Skeletons of a Bridge and is currently writing a second book, Running Alone in Photographs. Aside from his artistic talents, Mirabal is a father and a farmer, living in Taos Pueblo and participating in the traditional ways and rituals of his people.

== Musical career ==
Raised traditionally by his mother and grandparents on the pueblo, and born in 1966, Mirabal spoke Tiwa at home and began making flutes at the age of 19. In school, he had learned how to play clarinet, saxophone, piano, and drums, but found his true musical voice in the traditional Native American flute. He met the renowned Native American flute player R. Carlos Nakai as a young man and was greatly inspired by him.

He moved to New York City, playing in a multicultural band made up of a Senegalese guitarist, a Cape Verdean drummer and Haitian keyboardist. There, Mirabal immersed himself in the sound of hip-hop, funk and R&B, which would inform his later trademark music.

He recorded an independent debut album in 1988, and went on to land a contract with Warner Western and later, Silver Wave Records. His first projects were generally focused on traditional music consisting of Native American flute and percussion. One of his early albums, entitled Land was originally composed for two Japanese avant-garde modern dancers Eiko and Koma, who choreographed a dance production inspired by their impressions of the land around Taos. Cedar and clay flutes, percussion, rattles, and traditional vocals were used throughout the album. Reynaldo Lujan, a percussionist who would go on to collaborate with Mirabal for over a decade, played on the album along with Mark Andes. Each song told a different story about the land around Taos Mountain. The acclaimed performance toured Japan, Europe and the U.S. and in 1992, Mirabal was given New York's Dance and Performance Bessie Award for the score.

In 1996, Mirabal collaborated with Grammy Award-winning Native American singer-songwriter Bill Miller on an album Native Suite-Chants: Dances and the Remembered Earth. The project was both experimental and traditional, featuring flute and percussion as well as Mohican pow-wow singing.

All these disparate interests and experiences led to the band Mirabal in 1995. Bassist Mark Andes, from the '60s band Spirit and '80s rock group Heart, joined Robert along with Reynaldo Lujan. In 1997, they released the groundbreaking album Mirabal that fused rock, funk, and other contemporary forms of music with traditional music, drawing on the legacy of other Native American pop/rock musicians (such as Buffy Sainte-Marie) but creating a unique sound that would set Mirabal apart and gain further mainstream attention.

Mirabal came to greater national prominence during his performance in PBS' 1998 musical dance production, Spirit: A Journey in Dance, Drum, and Song, for which he composed the soundtrack with traditional flute and percussion. Due to the popularity of the program, the network went on to produce a music/dance program centered entirely on Mirabal and his traditional/rock fusion music in 2002, entitled Music from a Painted Cave. The program and its corresponding CD release were enthusiastically received by mainstream audiences and became a benchmark world music album. He also collaborated with John Tesh for the acclaimed PBS One World TV special for the millennium in 2000, which showcased music from around the world.

Mirabal's In the Blood CD (2007) on Star Road Records (www.starroadrecords.com) was featured in New Mexico Magazine for their October 2007 issue. The reviewer wrote that "it is one of his finest to date." His native state's tourism magazine lauded the CD's "lively danceable rhythms (that) should appeal to mainstream radio.... Mirabal (is) one of the trailblazers of tribal rock....

Mirabal was featured in a 2008 New Mexico Magazine story about Native American flute players, as well as another, 2014 story about the arts in Santa Fe, New Mexico.

In 2011 Mirabal joined the avant-garde string quartet ETHEL for a collaborative tour titled Music of the Sun. This is his second collaboration with the group, with whom he performed at BAM's Next Wave Festival in 2008.

He contributed music to the soundtrack of Vow of Silence: The Assassination of Annie Mae (2024), a 4-episode television series about Anna Mae Aquash.

== Discography ==
- Nomad (1994) with Nomad and Mor Thiam
- Song Carrier (1995)
- Land (1995)
- Warrior Magician (1996)
- Native Suite (1996, with Bill Miller)
- Mirabal (1997)
- Native American Lullabies: Under The Green Corn Moon (1998)
- Taos Tales (1999)
- Music from a Painted Cave (2001)
- Indians, Indians (2003)
- Sacred Ground: A Tribute to Mother Earth (2005, compilation)
- Johnny Whitehorse (2005)
- Pueblo Christmas (2007, with Patrick Mirabal)
- In the Blood (2007)
- Johnny Whitehorse: Totemic Flute Chants (2007)
- Johnny Whitehorse: Riders of the Healing Road (2007)
- The River (2016, with Ethel)
