= Tom Wasinger =

- Origin: Boulder, Colorado, United States
- Genres: Indigenous music of North America, instrumental music
- Years active: 1988–present
- Labels: Silver Wave Records, Myth-Informed Records, Vohnic Music LLC
- Website: http://www.tomwasinger.com

Tom Wasinger is an American audio engineer, record producer, and multi-instrumentalist based out of Boulder, Colorado, United States. He is most well known for his production work in indigenous music of North America, winning three Grammy awards and multiple independent awards for “Best Native American Music Album." Tom builds experimental musical instruments out of resonating stone, and is the founder of “The Lost Angel Stone Ensemble”, the world's only touring ensemble that performs with stone instruments. He is currently signed to independent record labels Silver Wave Records and Vohnic Music LLC.

== Early life ==
Tom moved to Colorado from his native Oklahoma in 1974 and lived in Fort Collins. In the 70s and 80s he fronted various rock bands touring regionally. In the late 80s Tom transitioned into the role of a producer and started the "Lost Angel Stone Ensemble" the world's first touring ensemble of resonating instruments.

== 1990s - 2010s ==
Tom and his wife, Susan Wasinger, started a project in 1993 aimed at recording lullabies from around the world. The album is titled “The World Sings Goodnight” and sold tens of thousands of copies after being featured on NPR’s “All Things Considered.” In 1996 Tom scored a mountain biking film entitled Tread directed by Bill Snyder. He continued working on various projects and was nominated for his first Grammy in 2001 for his production work on Joanne Shenandoah's “Peacemaker’s Journey.” The Native American album did go on to receive an Independent Music Award and a Nammy Award. After receiving these awards Tom focused more on Native American and indigenous music projects. This led to “Beneath the Raven Moon”, an album with artist Mary Youngblood. The album did exceptionally well in its genre, winning a Grammy and multiple independent awards as well as charting on the Billboard charts. Tom's follow up project in 2005 with Mary Youngblood titled “Dance With the Wind” won another Grammy for production. He won his third Grammy in 2009 for “Come to Me Great Mystery: Native American Healing Songs” a compilation album released by Silver Wave Records.

== 2010s - present ==
Tom works on various projects both in Native American music and other genres. He works from his studio outside Boulder, Colorado.

== Discography ==
Year	Song(s)	Artist	Album	Role
2017	All	Tom Wasinger	A Mended Soul	Primary Artist, Mastering, Arranger, Composer
2012	All	Various Artist	Spirit Walk: Natural Rhythms For Inspired Walking and Workouts	Mastering, Arranger, Composer
2008	All	Various Artist	Come to Me Great Mystery: Native America	Producer, Engineer, Arranger, Mixing, Photography, Instrumentation
2008	All	Mary Youngblood	Sacred Place: A Mary Youngblood Collection	Producer, Audio Production, Main Personnel, Vocals, Guitar, Harp, Zither, Cello, Mouth Bow, Piano, Chamberlin, Keyboards, Bass Instrument, Drums, Drum, Rainstick, Percussion, Chimes, Sampling, Hand Drums, Bass, Stick, Sampled Keyboards
2007	All	Tom & Susan Wasinger	Angels in the Wilderness	Primary Artist
2007	All	Andy Schiller	Horizons	Engineer
2006	All	Mary Youngblood	Dance with the Wind	Producer, Engineer, Mixing, Main Personnel, Various Instruments, Guitar, Cimbalom, Cittern, Dulcimer, Kora, Mandolin, Zither, Melodica, Chamberlin, Drums, Percussion, Chimes, Hand Drums, Bass, Stick, Cahones, Composer
2006	All	Lisa Miller	World of Love	Engineer, Guitar, Guitar (12 String), Shaker, Guitar (Rhythm), Production Assistant
2005	All	Joanne Shenandoah	Skywoman	Producer, Engineer, Mixing
2004	All	Various Artist	Beautiful Beyond: Christian Songs in Native Languages	Producer, Engineer
2004	All	Mary Youngblood	Feed the Fire	Producer, Engineer, Mixing, Guitar, Dobro, Cittern, Kora, Zither, Percussion, Hand Drums, Bass, Mountain Dulcimer, Native American Drums, Composer
2004	All	Various Artist	Many Blessings: A Native American Celebration	Producer, Publishing, Arranger, Vocals, Guitar, Cittern, Harp, Kora, Rebab, Zither, Ocarina, Keyboards, Drums, Percussion, Bass, Cajon, Mountain Dulcimer, Resonating Stones, Composer
2003	All	Elizabeth Roberts / Maisie Shenandoah	Sisters: Oneida Iroquois Hymns	Producer, Engineer, Arranger, Guitar, Banjo, Cittern, Autoharp, Bass, Mastering, Recording
2003	All	Maureen Smith	Spirit, Songs of Inspiration	Main Personnel, Guitar, Percussion
2003	All	Various Artist	The Rough Guide to American Roots	Arranger
2002	All	Mary Youngblood	Beneath the Raven Moon	Producer, Guitar, Lap Steel Guitar, Banjo, Berimbau, Cittern, Mandolin, Ukulele, Zither, Mouth Bow, Chamberlin, Keyboards, Percussion, Hand Drums, Bass, Cajon, String Arrangements, Marxophone, Mountain Dulcimer, Bowed Zither, Composer
2002	All	Joanne Shenandoah	Peace and Power: The Best of Joanne Shenandoah	Producer, Arranger, Musician
2002	All	Various Artist	Tribal Legends	Arranger
2001	All	Various Artist	Bears [Original Soundtrack]	Producer, Composer
2001	All	Joanne Shenandoah	Eagle Cries	Producer, Engineer, Guitar, Lap Steel Guitar, Banjo, Cittern, Mandolin, Oud, Zither, Mouth Bow, Drums, Kalimba, Percussion, Vocals (Background), Guitar (Rhythm), Mountain Dulcimer, Keyboard Accordion, Bowed Zither, Karakeb
2001	All	Tito la Rosa	The Prophecy of the Eagle and the Condor	Producer, Composer
2001	All	Various Artist	Tribal Dreams: Music From Native Americans	Composer, Primary Artist
2001	All	Various Artist	Under One Sky: Native American Flute & Rhythm	Composer
2000	All	Various Artist	Emerging Power	Producer
2000	All	Lawrence Laughing	Now Our Minds Are One	Producer
2000	All	Joanne Shenandoah	Peacemaker's Journey	Producer, Engineer, Arranger, Mixing
2000	All	Various Artist	Prayer for Peace	Producer, Guitar, Drums, Percussion, Vocals (Background), Bass, Resonating Stones
1999	All	Lee Nestor	Call It What It Is	Producer, Engineer, Vocals, Guitar, Guitar (Electric), Cittern, Autoharp, Hurdygurdy, Mandolin, Keyboards, Synthesizer, Tremolo
1999	All	Mary Youngblood	Heart of the World	Producer, Vocals, Guitar, Cittern, Eagle-Bone Whistle, Mouth Bow, Piano, Drums, Percussion, Hand Drums, Bass, Voices, Performer, Mastering, Mountain Dulcimer, Bowed Zither, Composer, Primary Artist
1998	All	Joanne Shenandoah	Orenda	Producer, Arranger, Vocals, Guitar, Cittern, Dulcimer, Harp, Autoharp, Flute, Ocarina, Mouth Bow, Drums, Percussion, Bass, Tremolo, Gopichard
1998	All	Various Artist	Rough Guide to Native American Music	Arranger
1998	All	Mary Youngblood	The Offering	Producer, Engineer, Mastering
1998	All	Various Artist	Under the Green Corn Moon: Native American Lullabies	Producer, Cittern, Harp, Autoharp, Flute, Mouth Bow, Drums, Percussion, Performer, Tremolo, Resonating Stones, Primary Artist
1997	All	Various Artist	Native American Currents	Producer, Guitar (Acoustic), Percussion, Bass, Digital Mastering, Mastering, Autoharp (Hammered)
1997	All	Various Artist	Tribal Fires: Contemporary Native American Music	Arranger
1996	All	Joanne Shenandoah	Matriarch: Iroquois Women's Songs	Guest Artist, Producer, Mixing, Liner Notes, Guitar, Autoharp, Percussion, Bass Programming, Pianolin, Tremolo, Resonating Stones
1995	All	Tom Wasinger	Many Moons	Primary Artist, Producer, Composer
1995	All	Various Artist	The Best of Silver Wave, Vol. 3: The Stars	Producer
1995	All	Various Artist	Winter Celebration [Silver Wave]	Producer, Vocals, Guitar, Percussion, Percussion Programming, Hand Drums, Bass, Performer, Composer, Primary Artist
1995	All	Various Artist	World Sings Goodnight 2	Producer, Compilation Producer, Multi Instruments, Performer, Primary Artist
1993	All	Various Artist	The Best of Silver Wave, Vol. 2: The Moon	Producer, Keyboards, Stick, Performer, Composer, Primary Artist
1993	All	World Sings Goodnight	The World Sings Goodnight	Producer, Vocals, Multi Instruments, Performer, Primary Artist
1992	All	Robert Gass & On Wings of Song	Medicine Wheel	Guitar (Acoustic), Musician
1991	All	Tom Wasinger	Rock Music	Primary Artist
1991	All	Tom Wasinger	Track to Bumbliwa	Primary Artist, Producer, Engineer, Vocals, Guitar, Keyboards, Synthesizer, Stick, Composer
1990	All	James Harvey	Earth Dreaming Dance	Keyboards
1988	All	Kevin Schrandt	Echoes Within The Forest	Guitar (Electric), Soloist
	All	Mark Thunderwolf	Open Your Heart	Composer

== Awards ==
Year	Nominee / work	Award	Result
1997	Joanne Shenandoah - Matriarch (as Producer)	Independent Music Award	Won
1999	Various Artists - Under the Green Corn Moon (as Producer)	Notable Award	Won
1999	Joanne Shenandoah & Lawrence Laughing - Orenda (as Producer)	Nammy Award	Won
2000	Mary Youngblood - Heart of the World (as Producer)	Independent Music Award	Won
2000	Mary Youngblood - Heart of the World (as Producer)	Nammy Award	Won
2000	Mary Youngblood - Heart of the World (as Producer)	Amazon.com Award	Won
2000	Mary Youngblood - Heart of the World (as Producer)	New Age Voice Award	Won
2001	Joanne Shenandoah - Peacemaker's Journey (as Producer)	Independent Music Award	Won
2001	Joanne Shenandoah - Peacemaker's Journey (as Producer)	Nammy Award	Won
2001	Joanne Shenandoah - Peacemaker's Journey (as Producer)	Grammy Award	Nominated
2003	Mary Youngblood - Beneath the Raven Moon (as Producer)	Grammy Award	Won
2003	Mary Youngblood - Beneath the Raven Moon (as Producer)	Independent Music Award	Won
2005	Mary Youngblood - Feed the Fire (as Producer)	Nammy Award	Won
2007	Mary Youngblood - Dance With the Wind (as Producer)	Grammy Award	Won
2009	Various Artists - Come to Me Great Mystery (as Producer)	Grammy Award	Won
2009	Kevin Locke - Earth Gift (as Producer)	Nammy Award	Won
