= William Eaton (guitarist) =

American new-age guitarist and luthier

William Eaton is a New Age guitarist and luthier, known for building unique instruments, particularly harp guitars. Eaton is currently the director of the Roberto-Venn School of Luthiery. In 2015, Eaton was conferred the Governor of Arizona Arts Award. Eaton lives in Sedona, Arizona.

== Biography ==
In 1971 Eaton lived in Tempe, Arizona, where he was trying to sell guitars he had built. He met John Roberts, a luthier from Phoenix, who would later found the Roberto-Venn school. His interaction with Roberts sparked his interest in building guitars, and a short while later he built a guitar in Roberts' shop. Eaton went on to complete an MBA at Stanford University in 1975. He returned to Tempe after this, and accepted a position as instructor at the newly established Roberto-Venn school. He designed his first harp guitar in 1976, which he called a 26-string guitar. Based on a standard guitar design, it had extra strings stretched over the body. Many of his instruments have been featured in museums, including the Hollywood Bowl Museum. The instruments he designs, builds and plays include unique instruments like the "koto harp guitar," and the double-necked "o'ele 'n strings". He is based in Phoenix, Arizona. The "o'ele 'n strings" have two sets of strings over a carved and engraved body, inspired by an armoire.

Eaton has released 16 recordings on the Canyon Records label, including several with collaborators. Four of these are with members of the "William Eaton ensemble," which he leads. He has been nominated for four Grammy Awards. Eaton has collaborated for more than 25 years with Native American flutist Carlos Nakai. The music they write is often inspired by the culture and landscape of the southwestern United States, and has been described as "haunting, highly resonant, and [original]."
