= Verdell Primeaux =

American musician

Verdell Primeaux is an Oglala, Yankton/Ponca singer and songwriter in the Native American Church tradition of peyote songs, accompanied by rattle and water drum. He and Johnny Mike (Navajo) are known as the duo Primeaux and Mike.

Primeaux was born in 1966 in Scottsbluff, Nebraska to the Pine Ridge Oglala Lakota Nation, South Dakota, and is the son of noted peyote singer Francis Primeaux Senior and grandson of Harry Primeaux. He currently resides in Many Farms, Arizona with his wife and children.

His music partner, Mike is originally from Kitsili, Black Mesa, Arizona. Mike's maternal clan is Near the Water People and on his father's side he represents the Salt Clan. He has two children, Rachael and Shane, and resides in Chinle, Arizona.

== Achievements ==
- 2002 Grammy Award with Johnny Mike, co-artist, for Best Native American Music Album, Bless The People - Harmonized Peyote Songs, Jack Miller, engineer, Giuli Doyle & Robert Doyle, producers.
- 2002 Nammy Award with Johnny Mike, co-artist, for Best Traditional Recording, Bless the People.

== Discography ==
- Peyote Songs of the Yankton Sioux – Three Volumes (https://indianrecordsinc.com/shop/yankton-sioux-peyote-songs-three-volumes/) with Francis Primeaux, Leroy Magpie Hoof, Francis Primeaux, Jr. and Verdell Primeaux
- Peyote Songs (vol.1) (Canyon Records-16301) with Johnny Mike
- Peyote & Healing Songs (vol.2) (CR-16302) with Robert Attson
- Peyote Songs (vol.3) (CR-16303) with Johnny Mike
- Walk in Beauty: Healing Songs 1995 (vol.4) (CR-16304) with Johnny Mike
- Peyote Songs (vol.5) (CR-16305) with Johnny Mike
- Peyote Songs in Sioux & Navajo (CR-6301) with Johnny Mike
- Sacred Path (vol.6) (CR-6306) with Joe Jakob
- Peyote Songs of the Native American Church (vol.7) (CR-6309) with Johnny Mike
- Gathering of Voices (vol.8) (CR-6310) with Johnny Mike
- Live in Harmony (CR-6313) with Johnny Mike
- Evolution: Generation to Generation 2000 (CR-6314) with Johnny Mike
- Bless the People: Harmonized Peyote Songs 2001 (CR-6317) with Johnny Mike
- Hours Before Dawn 2002 (CR-6342) with Johnny Mike
- Lost and Lonely 2009
- Stories Told 2008 (CR-6432) with Terry Hanks
- The Color of Morning 2007 (CR-7081) with Xavier Quijas Yxayotl of Guadalajara
- Healing Winds (Cool Runnings Music) with Johnny Mike
- Mystical Warrior (CRM)
- Peyote Songs From Lakota Country (CRM)
- Veterans and Honor Songs (CRM)
