= Canyon Records =

American record label

- Founded: 1951
- Founder: Ray Boley and Mary Boley
- Genre: Native American music
- Country of origin: United States
- Location: Phoenix, Arizona
- Official website: canyonrecords.com

Canyon Records of Phoenix, Arizona, is a record label that has produced and distributed Native American music for 56 years.

== History ==
Canyon was founded in 1951 by Ray and Mary Boley, who had opened the first recording studio in Phoenix, Arizona Recording Productions, in 1948. The Boley's involvement with Native American music began when Ray was asked by the Phoenix Little Theater to record a Navajo singer named Ed Lee Natay. Boley was so taken with what he heard that he recorded a collection of songs titled Natay, Navajo Singer, an album still in active release.

To promote the album, the Boleys took a booth at the 1951 Arizona State Fair. For most fairgoers, the recording was only a curiosity, but for Native Americans it was a revelation. They had never seen any of their music available on record before, and the album was well received within the Native community. Before the close of the fair, a Hopi jeweler at a booth next to the Boleys suggested they record Hopi music.

The Boleys took the idea to heart and soon began recording music from nations throughout the southwest. The duo’s new label, Canyon Records, was a sister company of Canyon Films, a company also founded in 1951 specializing in documentaries and commercial work.

Prior to the Boleys' efforts, most recordings were produced and released for the benefit of scholars and academics. The Boleys saw their Native American neighbors as customers, tailoring their releases to fit the needs and requests of the Native community. In an era when Native Americans were a little-understood, often-ignored, and frequently oppressed minority, Canyon Records served as an important validation of their music, artists, culture, and community.

In 1971, the Boleys sold Canyon Films and expanded the efforts of Canyon Records. The duo opened a retail operation in Phoenix and began building a distribution network. This development was laborious and involved extensive travel by motor home across the country. Many store owners did not see the potential of selling Native American music. One shopkeeper in Bemidji, Minnesota (adjacent to a significant reservation), responded with, "Indian music...who wants it?" and thus ignoring the potential customers passing his door. Despite this resistance, the Boleys succeeded in building a distribution network throughout the western United States and Canada to sell Canyon titles as well those of other Native American music producers.

In 1984, in an attempt to semi-retire, the Boleys sold their store and distribution company (which still operates under the name Drumbeat Indian Arts) to focus solely on production. At this time, Boley made contact with a Native American flutist named R. Carlos Nakai. Boley had known Nakai's father, Raymond Nakai, who played Canyon music on his Navajo language radio program before becoming Navajo tribal chairman. R. Carlos Nakai had produced a recording of solo flute music called Changes, and Boley asked to distribute it. Nakai, who had been turned down by several record labels, agreed.

Prior to Changes, most of Canyon's sales were to the Native American community. With the release of Changes, Canyon began to place this recording in gift shops, art galleries, and new age-oriented retailers. As it became clear that Nakai's music had significant crossover potential in the gift/tourist and new age markets, Canyon began to build new distribution. The soothing, transporting quality of Nakai's flute music was instantly attractive, and for non-Native listeners, his recordings quickly defined Native American music. Nakai's music would lead the expansion of Native American music into mainstream retailing in the 1990s, and Nakai would release more than thirty-five albums and publish a book with Canyon.

The 1980s and 1990s also saw the growth of other styles of Native American music, such as Pow-wow, peyote song, and contemporary fusions (rock, hip-hop, new age) as the Native American community increased in population and acculturation. The non-Native community began to share greater interest in Native American culture, fueled by major media productions such as Dances with Wolves, Geronimo: An American Legend, 500 Nations, and others.

In 1992, Boley sold Canyon to his long-time executive assistant, Robert Doyle and retired (Mary died in 1991, Ray would die in 2002). Canyon continued to develop its relationship with Nakai and both traditional and contemporary artists. In 2000, Canyon, needing more warehouse space, purchased its present location and acquired a commercial recording studio (Jack Miller Productions), while adding a website management and graphic design company (Nile Graphics).

Canyon has earned the only two gold records for Native American music, both by Nakai, for Canyon Trilogy and Earth Spirit. Additionally, Canyon albums have received twenty-two Grammy nominations, with one win for Primeaux & Mike's Bless the People. Canyon has won four INDIE Awards (the Grammy equivalent for independent record labels) as well as twenty-five Native American Music Awards (Nammies).

Canyon has also developed new forms of Native American music by such artists as Louie Gonnie; Cheevers Toppah; Alex Smith & Kit Landry; Randy Wood; and Jay & Tiinesha Begaye, among many talented performers. Canyon also continues to work with artists in Pow-Wow music (Black Lodge, Northern Cree, tha Tribe, Elk Soldier, Warscout) Native Church Music (Verdell Primeaux, Kevin Yazzie, Louie Gonnie, Gerald Primeaux), and chicken scratch (Thee Express, Southern Scratch).
