= Douglas Spotted Eagle =

- Born: Douglas Wallentine; 1962 (age 63–64)
- Origin: Valley Junction, Iowa
- Occupations: Audio engineer, producer, flautist
- Years active: 1990 - present
- Label: Formerly at Windham Hill Records
- Website: www.spottedeagle.com

Douglas Spotted Eagle (born Douglas Wallentine) is a musician and producer, primarily known for audio engineering and production, for which he has won a Grammy Award, as well as for playing the Native American-style flute. He is listed in the Library of Folk Music, The Native American Almanac, and NAIIP Musical Paths as a non-Native flautist who composes New Age and "contemporary ethnic" music.

== Music career ==
His music mixes jazz, new age, pop, and world beat with his interpretations of Native American music. In his book, World Music, Richard Nidel described him as a flautist and film composer "who incorporates synthesizers into Native sounds."

== Video production and software ==
Spotted Eagle is the producer of Sundance Media Group's 2002 video The Way of the Pow-Wow.

== Background and personal life ==
Spotted Eagle is not Native American himself. Born Douglas Wallentine, he was raised in a non-Native family in Valley Junction, Iowa. After his family moved to Salt Lake City, Utah, he was a guitarist in a Christian rock band.

He says he grew up around Lakota and Navajo families in Iowa and Utah, the former of which he says gave him his name when he was 14 or 16. However, his claims of adoption into any Native American culture, his use of a Native American-sounding name, and concerns around the Indian Arts and Crafts Act have led to writers and reviewers emphasizing that he is not Native American.

Spotted Eagle lives in Utah. He lost his son Joshua Davis Wallentine to suicide.

His hobbies include wingsuiting. In 2015 he was appointed the U.S. Team Manager for the First World Cup of Wingsuit Performance Flying.

== Discography ==
- 1990 - Sacred Feelings (SOAR)
- 1991 - CanyonSpeak (SOAR; reissued 2000)
- 1991 - Legend of the Flute Boy (SOAR; reissued 2007)
- 1992 - Stand at the Center (Natural Visions NV101)
- 1993 - Human Rites (Natural Visions NV102)
- 1994 - Ultimate Collection (Natural Visions/NV103)
- 1994 - Common Ground (Natural Visions/NV106)
- 1995 - Between Father Sky and Mother Earth by Various Artists
- 1996 - Closer to far Away (Windham Hill/BMG)
- 1997 - Tenaya: Ode to Yosemite (Natural Visions/NV120)
- 1998 - Pray (Higher Octave)
- 1999 - Voices

== Publications ==
- Making Arrows the Old Way!! (as Doug Wallentine. Later reissued after name change) Eagles View Publishing / self-published (1987)
- Voices of Native America: Native American Music Eagles View Publishing / self-published (1997) ISBN 978-0943604565
- Using Soundtrack: Produce Original Music for Video, DVD, and Multimedia (2004) ISBN 978-1578202294
- Instant Encore DVD 1.5 (2004) ISBN 9781578202454
- Instant Vegas 5 (2004) ISBN 978-1578202607
- Digital Video Basics: Your Guide to Making Great Movies (2004) ISBN 978-0976238003
- HDV: What You NEED to Know (2004)ISBN 978-0976238010
- Instant Digital Audio: VASST Instant Series (2005 ) ISBN 978-1-57820-276-8
- HDV : What You NEED to Know! **Second Edition**, The Complete Guide (2006) ISBN 978-0976238027
