= Joseph Fire Crow =

Joseph Fire Crow Ho'ėspenáhkohe
- Born: March 29, 1959; Crow Agency, Montana
- Died: July 11, 2017 (aged 58) Winsted, Connecticut
- Occupation: Flautist
- Years active: 1992-2017
- Website: www.josephfirecrow.com

Joseph Fire Crow (Cheyenne: Ho'ėspenáhkohe; March 29, 1959 – July 11, 2017) was a Cheyenne flutist. He released albums from 1992 to 2017. His album Cheyenne Nation was nominated for a Grammy in 2001. Fire Crow appeared many times as a guest musician on recordings by other musicians in the industry.

== Career ==
In addition to his Grammy nomination, Fire Crow earned top honors among his peers in the Native American Music Awards (NAMA) organization. In 2003, he received the NAMA "Song Writer of the Year" award for Legend of the Warrior. In 2005, Fire Crow was recognized for his work with the Billings Symphony, taking home the NAMA award for "Best Instrumental Recording." He was the 2006 recipient of NAMA's "Flutist of the Year" award for his work on Red Beads.

Some of Fire Crow's music is included on the soundtrack of the Ken Burns documentary Lewis and Clark: The Journey of the Corps of Discovery.

Fire Crow died on July 11, 2017, at the age of 58 after battling idiopathic pulmonary fibrosis.

== Discography ==
- The Mist (1992)
- Rising Bird (1994)
- Fire Crow (1996)
- Cheyenne Nation (2000)
- Legend of the Warrior (2003)
- Red Beads (2005) Makoché Music

== Sources ==
- "Joseph Fire Crow - Bio" from Josephfirecrow.com, URL accessed 4 June 2008
