= Joanne Shenandoah =

Native American singer and musician (1957–2021)

Joanne Shenandoah Tekaliwhakwah
- Born: Joanne Lynn Shenandoah; June 23, 1957; Syracuse, New York, U.S.
- Died: November 22, 2021 (aged 64) Scottsdale, Arizona
- Occupations: Singer, guitarist, author
- Instruments: Vocals, acoustic guitar

Joanne Lynn Shenandoah (Oneida: Tekaliwhakwah; June 23, 1957 – November 22, 2021) was a Native American singer, composer, and multi-instrumentalist based in the United States. She was a citizen of the Oneida Indian Nation, Wolf clan, based in New York. Her music combined traditional melodies with a blend of modern instrumentation, and her lyrics conveyed her interests in nature, women's lives and Iroquois culture.

Shenandoah recorded more than 15 albums and won numerous awards, including an Honorary Doctorate of Music from Syracuse University in 2002. She received a Grammy Award for her part in the album Sacred Ground: A Tribute to Mother Earth (2005), which had tracks by numerous artists.

== Early life and education ==
Joanne Lynn Shenandoah was born on June 23, 1957, in Syracuse, New York, to Maisie Shenandoah, Wolf Clan Mother of the Oneida Indian Nation, in New York, and Clifford Shenandoah, an Onondaga Nation chief from the Beaver clan. Both nations are part of the Haudenosaunee (Iroquois Confederacy). She had four sisters, Wanda, Vicky, Diane, and Danielle, as well as a brother, Jerry. As the Oneida have a matrilineal kinship system, the siblings were all considered to be born into their mother's Wolf clan. Through her father's line, she was a direct descendant of Skenandoa, also known as John Shenandoah, an Oneida ."pine tree chief."

Joanne Shenandoah grew up on the Oneida Reservation near Oneida, New York. She learned many traditional songs and music styles, and played many instruments, including piano, guitar, flute, and cello. She was given the name Tekaliwhakwah, which translates as "she She attended Andrews University and Montgomery College.

== Works ==
Joanne Shenandoah started performing in the Syracuse, New York, area. She made 23 recordings, and her first solo CD was recorded in 1989. She wrote music and developed her own style, blending traditional and contemporary techniques and instrumentation, singing in English and in Mohawk or other Iroquois languages. In addition to her solo works, she performed tracks with other musicians, or contributed tracks to group albums.

Although based in the Syracuse area, she traveled frequently for her mostly solo performances in the United States and internationally. In 2011, Shenandoah and her daughter Leah recorded on the title track Path to Zero with Jim Morrison. The album also included artists, Sting/Bono, Sinéad O'Connor, Robert Downey, Jr. and others.

Shenandoah was invited to Rome, Italy, to participate in the October 2012 celebration of the canonization of Kateri Tekakwitha, the first Roman Catholic Native American saint. Shenandoah performed an original composition for this occasion at The Vatican – St. Peter's Basilica. She performed in major venues and at major public events, including at The White House, Carnegie Hall, five Presidential Inaugurations, Madison Square Garden, Crystal Bridges Museum, National Museum of the American Indian, The Ordway Theater, Hummingbird Centre, Toronto Skydome, Parliament of the World's Religions, (Africa, Spain and Australia) and Woodstock '94. Her songs were featured in the television series Northern Exposure.

== Recognition ==
Shenandoah was a Grammy Award winner. She received more Native American Music Awards (14) than any other Native Artist, and a total of more than 40 music awards. She has also received numerous Indie Awards and Syracuse Area Music Awards (SAMMYS). She was presented with the Rigoberta Menchú – Highest award by the Native Film Festival in Montreal, Quebec, Canada for her soundtrack in the documentary, Our Land Our Life.

In 2012, Shenandoah was honored with the Atlas Award for her work with the climate change movement, both in the US and around the world.

== Personal life ==
Shenandoah's family is deeply invested in Haudenosaunee culture. Her daughter, Leah Shenandoah, accompanied the singer on the road across continents to perform since she was a child. She formed an important part of many of Shenandoah's projects, and today she continues Shenandoah's legacy as a matriarch devoted to teaching traditions to Shenandoah's grandson. Leah Shenandoah is also a recognized singer, designer, and international collaborator.

Shenandoah married Doug George-Kanentiio (Akwesasne Mohawk), a co-founder of the Native American Journalists Association and a published author.

Shenandoah was one of the original board members of the Hiawatha Institute for Indigenous Knowledge, which operates in partnership with Syracuse University.

Shenandoah died from idiopathic liver failure on November 22, 2021, in a Scottsdale, Arizona, hospital at age 64.

== Discography ==
- Joanne Shenandoah (1989). "Joanne Shenandoah". Canyon Records.
- Joanne Shenandoah (1994). "Once in a Red Moon". Canyon Records.
- Joanne Shenandoah (2005). "Loving Ways". Canyon Records.
- Joanne Shenandoah (1995). "Life Blood". Silver Wave.
- Joanne Shenandoah (1996). "Matriarch: Iroquois Women's Songs". Silver Wave.
- Joanne Shenandoah (1997). "All Spirits Sing". Rhino Records.
- Joanne Shenandoah (1998). "Orenda". Silver Wave.
- Joanne Shenandoah (2000). "Peacemaker's Journey". Silver Wave.
- Joanne Shenandoah (2000). "Warrior In Two Worlds". Red Feather.
- Joanne Shenandoah (2001). "Eagle Cries". Red Feather.
- Joanne Shenandoah (2003). "Covenant". Silver Wave.
- Joanne Shenandoah (2005). "Skywoman". Silver Wave.
- Maisie Shenandoah; Liz Robert (2003). "Sisters: Oneida Iroquois Hymns". Silver Wave.
- Joanne Shenandoah & Michael Bucher (2005). "Bitter Tears Sacred Ground". Hondo Mesa Records. Archived from the original on November 22, 2009.
- Joanne Shenandoah (2005). "Enchanted Garden". Warner Chappell. Archived from the original on November 22, 2009.
- Joanne Shenandoah (2011). "Lifegivers". Warner Chappell. Archived from the original on November 22, 2009.
- Joanne Shenandoah (2011). "One World Christmas". Warner Chappell. Archived from the original on November 22, 2009.

=== As contributor ===
- Peter Kater; R. Carlos Nakai (1995). "How the West Was Lost, Vol. 2". Silver Wave.
- Robbie Robertson (1998). "Contact from the Underworld of Red Boy". Capitol Records.
- Mary Youngblood (1999). "Heart of the World". Silver Wave.
- Mary Youngblood (2004). "Feed the Fire". Silver Wave.
- Tony Hymas Oyaté. "Tony Hymas Oyaté". Nato.
