= List of Native American musicians =

This is a list of Native American musicians and singers, as well as bands which contain one or more members who are indigenous.

Native American identity can at times be a complex and contested issue. The Bureau of Indian Affairs defines a Native American as having American Indian or Alaska Native ancestry. Due to issues of native identity fraud, it must be stated that this page aims to list only individuals whom have reliably-sourced Native American citizenship or ancestry.

Historical figures might predate tribal enrollment practices and could be included based on ethnological tribal membership. Contemporary individuals should be considered for this list only if they are enrolled members of federally recognized tribes, have cited Native American ancestry, or are recognized as being Native American by a respective tribes(s). Legally, being Native American is defined as being enrolled in a federally recognized tribe or Alaskan village. Factors such as culture, history, language, ethnicity, religion, and familial kinships can influence identity. For guidelines on naming conventions and sourcing Native American and identities, see Determining Native American and Indigenous Canadian identities and WP:Ethnicity.

For Indigenous musicians in and from Canada, see List of Indigenous musicians in Canada.

== Classical ==
- Steven Alvarez (Yaqui/Mescalero Apache/Upper Tanana Athabascan) composer, percussionist, film & stage producer
- Timothy Archambault (Kichesipirini Algonquin), flutist
- Dawn Avery (Mohawk), composer, cellist, vocalist, educator
- Louis W. Ballard (Quapaw/Cherokee), known as the father of Native American composition
- Raven Chacon (Navajo), composer and visual artist
- Atalie Unkalunt (Cherokee Nation), opera and Indianist singer

== Country and folk ==
- Joanne Shenandoah (Oneida Indian Nation)
- Buddy Red Bow (Oglala Lakota)
- Trixie Mattel (Bad River Ojibwe)

== Gospel ==
- Johnny P. Curtis (San Carlos Apache)
- Klaudt Indian Family, including Lillian White Corn Little Soldier (Arikara-Mandan)

== Jazz ==
- Mildred Bailey (jazz singer) (Coeur d'Alene)
- Jim Pepper (Muscogee/Kaw)
- Big Chief Russell Moore (Pima)

== Native American flute ==
- Robert Tree Cody (Hunkpapa/Maricopa)
- Brent Michael Davids, (Stockbridge Mohican)
- Joseph FireCrow (Northern Cheyenne)
- Charles Littleleaf (Warm Springs/Blackfoot)
- Kevin Locke (Lakota)
- Tom Mauchahty-Ware (Kiowa/Comanche)
- Bill Miller (Mahican)
- Robert Mirabal (Taos Pueblo)
- R. Carlos Nakai (Navajo/Ute)
- Sonny Nevaquaya (Comanche)
- Andrew Vasquez (Kiowa Apache)
- Tommy Wildcat (Cherokee Nation/Muscogee/Natchez)
- Mary Youngblood (Aleut/Seminole)

== Native American protest singers ==
- Floyd Red Crow Westerman (Sisseton Wahpeton Oyate)
- John Trudell (Santee Dakota)

== New age and world music ==
- Brulé (Sioux)
- Joanne Shenandoah (Oneida Indian Nation)
- Verdell Primeaux and Johnny Mike (Oglala/Yankton/Ponca/Navajo)

== Pop and rock ==
- Tommy Allsup, guitar player for Buddy Holly, Bob Willis and His Texas Playboys (Cherokee)
- Joey Belladonna of Anthrax is of Iroquois descent on his mother's side.
- Chuck Billy of Testament is of Pomo descent.
- Blackfoot
- Jimmy Carl Black of The Mothers of Invention (Cheyenne, Arapaho).
- Jim Boyd (Colville)
- Jesse Ed Davis (Kiowa)
- Peter DePoe (Confederated Tribes of Siletz Indians of Oregon), drummer in Redbone
- Willy DeVille (Pequot)
- Gary Duncan of Quicksilver Messenger Service (Skidi Pawnee)
- Nokie Edwards (Cherokee)
- Joy Harjo (Mvskoke), her band is Poetic Justice
- Indigenous (Nakota)
- Debora Iyall of Romeo Void (Cowlitz)
- Jana (Lumbee)
- Grant-Lee Phillips (Muscogee (Creek)), Red Earth
- Redbone, members include Siletz and Yaqui/Shoshone descent
- Robbie Robertson, singer-songwriter and member of The Band who was of Cayuga and Mohawk descent
- Keith Secola (Bois Forte Chippewa)
- John Trudell (Santee Dakota)
- XIT, members are Colville, Isleta Pueblo, Diné, and Muscogee Creek
- Spencer Battiest (Seminole/Choctaw)
- Sky Ferreira (Chippewa Cree)
- Samantha Crain (Choctaw Nation)
- Black Belt Eagle Scout (Swinomish/Iñupiaq)
- Quinn Christopherson (Alaskan Athabaskan/Iñupiaq)

== Punk and metal ==
- Chuck Billy of Testament (Pomo)
- Blackbraid (Mohawk)
- Blackfire (Navajo)
- Brujeria (Mestizo)
- Corporate Avenger
- Dystopia (Pascua Yaqui Tribe)
- Joey Belladonna of Anthrax (Iroquois)
- Ronnie Radke of Falling in Reverse (Blackfoot)

== Rap and hip hop ==
- Jaynez (Navajo)
- Julian B. (Muscogee)
- Litefoot (Cherokee Nation/Chichimeca)
- Mato Wayuhi (Oglala Lakota)
- Supaman (Apsáalooke)
- Frank Waln (Sicangu Lakota)
- Sten Joddi (Muscogee)
- Jeremiah Manitopyes (Cree)

== Powwow music ==
- Black Lodge Singers (Piegan Blackfeet)
- Cozad Singers (Kiowa)
- A Tribe Called Red/ The Halluci Nation

== See also ==
- Native American composers
