= Scatter Their Own =

American rock band

Oglala Lakota Pine Ridge Flag

Scatter Their Own was a Rock Band (formed in 2012) by Scott Clifford (Guitarist and Vocalist). In the Lakota language, the tribe name Oglala translates to "scatter one's own", desiring to scatter Lakota perspective throughout the country.

Originating from the South Dakota Pine Ridge Indian Reservation, Clifford created songs about his Indigenous culture. One of the main goals was to influence the Indigenous society to make a positive difference. Scott Clifford began his musical career as a song writer and backup vocalist/guitarist for the Native American band Indigenous.

The Oglala Lakota, has performed in events such as the 2016 Gathering of Nations Pow Wow and was nominated for the Native American Music awards. Love for music has also allowed the opportunity to fight for Indigenous equality and culture, hoping to bring awareness to the detrimental events that have affected many Native Americans' lives.

Scatter Their Own has released two albums - Catch A Fire (2012) and Taste the Time (2014) - with eight songs in total. Even with a limited catalogue, constant travel throughout the United States has increased awareness for Indigenous people. The Band has performed at many reservations, along with other venues from "Canada to Texas as well as journeying from Los Angeles to New York City." Well known throughout the Native American community, the internet and social media has allowed for more followers to support this Band. Creating songs that focus on Lakota identity and environmental issues: protection of sacred land is extremely important to the band. As songs were written about the earth, the Band’s voice was heard by non-natives and their passion for music brings awareness to the lives living on the Indian Reservations.

== Sacredness of Water ==
The song, "Taste The Time," was the first music video created by the band, partly funded by backers through INDIEGOGO. With the musical arrangement written by Scott Clifford and directed by Willi White II.

== Involvement Against Water Contamination ==
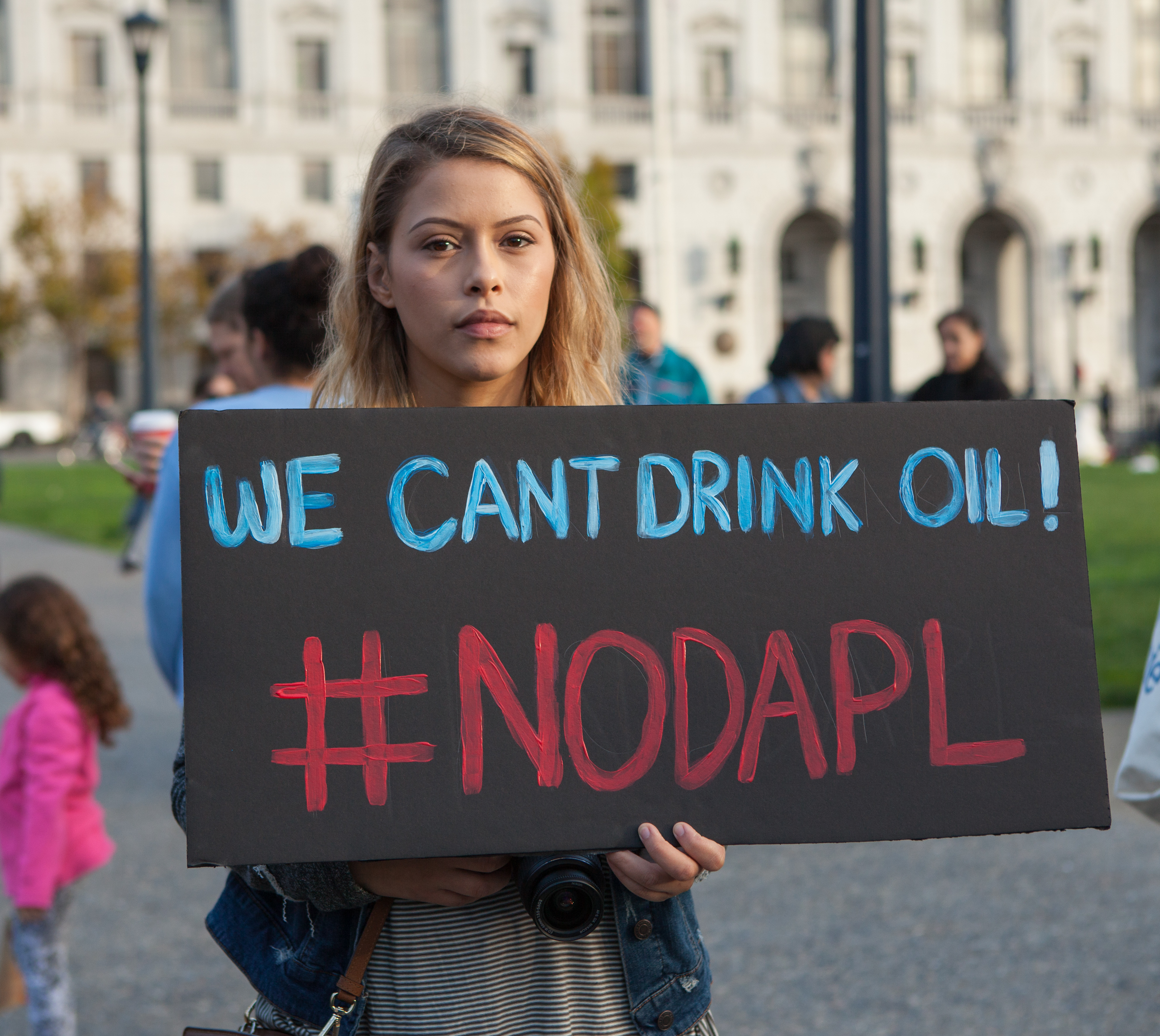
2016 protests against Dakota Access Pipeline

During the 2016 protest of the 1,172-mile-long Dakota Access Pipeline

The Keystone Pipeline is another oil pipeline system that began its construction in 2010, also causing political, environmental, and Indigenous Issues in the South Dakota reservation. In 2017, this pipeline was reported to have leaked 210,000 gallons of oil on the land, potentially affecting wildlife and water sources. Although, the spill did not happen on the Indigenous Sioux Tribe, the proximity of the spill between the land was close enough to have affected the water. Of course, concerns were brought up by the Indigenous people and other environmental activists, worrying about the effects on water and future complications.

== Disbanded (2018) ==
Scott Clifford disbanded Scatter Their Own in February 2018

== Discography ==
- Catch A Fire - EP (2012)
  - "Running"
  - "Catch a Fire"
  - "Taste the Time"
  - "Earth & Sky"
- Taste the Time (2014)
  - "Just Breathe"
  - "All I Have"
  - "Catch a Fire"
  - "Taste the Time"
  - "Forevers Endeavors"
  - "Running"
  - "Earth & Sky"
  - "Don't Fear to Tread"
