= John Donald Robb =

American composer and musicologist

John Donald Robb (June 12, 1892 – January 6, 1989) was an American composer, ethnomusicologist, arts administrator, and attorney.

== Biography ==
=== Early life ===
A symphony concert in his hometown of Minneapolis when he was a pre-teen inspired Robb to pursue a career as a composer. He began studying cello, and then pipe organ. While pursuing an undergraduate degree in English literature at Yale University, Robb continued his music education, including a course taught by Horatio Parker. Despite his passion for music, Robb turned to a career in the law. He attended both the University of Minnesota Law School and Harvard Law School.

Robb worked as an international bond lawyer in New York City, but also learned music. During a 1935–36 leave of absence from his law firm, he studied composition with Nadia Boulanger at the American Conservatory in Fontainebleau, France. It was her encouragement that gave him the confidence to pursue his dream of being a composer. Throughout his life, he made time to study composition; his teachers included Horatio Parker, Darius Milhaud, Roy Harris, Paul Hindemith, and Nadia Boulanger.

=== Professional shift ===
In 1941, after 18 years as a lawyer, Robb left his New York law practice to become a professor at the University of New Mexico in Albuquerque, New Mexico. One of his first achievements was to establish the University of New Mexico Symphony Orchestra, which continued to thrive in 2013. He played a major role in building the college's Department of Music. Among the many composition students, he influenced are Halim El-Dabh and John Lewis of the Modern Jazz Quartet. Robb served as Dean of the university's College of Fine Arts from 1942 to 1957. He became known as Dean Robb, a title that stayed with him for the rest of his life. In 1986, he received an honorary Doctor of Music degree from the University of New Mexico.

=== Interest on folk music ===
Not long after arriving in New Mexico, Robb became enamored of the Hispanic and indigenous cultures, in particular their distinctive music. On many weekends, he and his wife, Harriet, would travel to the rural communities that dotted the state. Sometimes Robb had fixed appointments, but other times, they simply happened upon community gatherings. With permission of the performers, Robb would use his Wollensak wire recorder, hooked up to his car battery, to record the musicians' impromptu performances. "From the offices in the UNM Music Department to the dance hall across the street from the Rainbow Bar in Cuba, New Mexico, Robb recorded anyone willing to spend the time singing and playing for him". This effort would ultimately result in nearly 3,000 field recordings of traditional music from the American Southwest, Nepal, and South America, which form the core of the John Donald Robb Archive of Southwestern Music at the University of New Mexico.

=== Composition ===
Robb's commitment to preserving traditional songs resulted in him using them as inspiration for his own works. His regional opera, Little Jo, written in 1947–48, drew from Hispanic folk music. Another work, Joy Comes to Deadhorse, also illustrates Robb's fascination with the aesthetics of the Southwest. Set on two adjoining ranches in the Southwest, Joy Comes to Deadhorse centers around an Anglo-Hispanic couple who fall in love despite opposition from their fathers. Due to lackluster reception, Robb began an unsuccessful collaboration with Tom Jones, a young unknown lyricist at the time. After several years of conflicting interest, Robb agreed to relinquish his rights to the work to Jones, who reworked it with Harvey Schmidt into a non-Hispanic version. The result was The Fantasticks, which ran for 42 years at the Sullivan Theater in New York for a total of 17,162 performances.

Robb composed a large body of music, including two operas, symphonic and chamber music, and electronic music. His orchestral works have been played by many major orchestras in the United States and abroad under conductors, such as Hans Lange, Maurice Bonney, Maurice Abravanel, Leonard Slatkin, Gilberto Orellano, Yoshimi Takeda, Guillermo Figueroa, James Richards, and Franz Vote.

=== Electronic music ===
Robb was in his 70s when he discovered an entirely new medium for his musical compositions. In the summer of 1965, he attended a seminar hosted by Robert Moog in upstate New York to learn more about the revolutionary new instrument which came to be known as the Moog synthesizer. Shortly thereafter, he became one of the first to purchase the synthesizer and set about to create a new body of electronic music. In all, Robb composed more than 65 electronic works.

At a 1969 concert, he collaborated with the Albuquerque Symphony Orchestra to present "Transmutation for Orchestra and Electronic Instrument", one of his compositions that involved both the Moog synthesizer and an orchestra. A selection of his electronic works was presented at a 1969 international music festival in Trieste, Italy. As a pioneer in this new medium, he spoke at conferences around the world. In 2012, Robb was recognized as one of 12 pioneers of electronic music featured in the Moog Foundation's 2012 wall calendar.

Robb died in 1989 at the age of 96, within 10 days of the death of his beloved wife, Harriet. They had been married for 68 years. He was active as a composer well into his 90s and completed his Requiem, which was his last major composition when he was 93.

== The archives ==
Four distinct collections make up the John Donald Robb Archives in the UNM University Libraries' Center for Southwest Research. They are the John Donald Robb Field Recordings, which can be listened to online; the John Donald Robb Photograph Collection, the John Donald Robb Papers, which include original Robb's original music manuscripts, and the John Donald Robb Musical Trust Records. Also included in the archives are collections preserved by Robb's associates. This list includes Hispanic music, Native American chants, music from South America and Europe, and oral histories.

== Publications ==
In 1954, Robb published Hispanic Folk Songs of New Mexico (UNM Press), a book that presents a selection of songs along with the insightful background of the different genres of music. The book was revised in 2008. More Hispanic Folk Songs of New Mexico was planned for publication in 2014.

His magnum opus, often referred to as the Big Book, is Hispanic Folk Music of New Mexico and the Southwest: A Self-Portrait of a People, which was out of print for many years and achieved "collectable" status. A revised edition, from UNM Press, was published in March 2014.

The University of Oklahoma Press wrote when the book was first published in 1980: "In some 700 songs and melodies, most with English translations and musical transcriptions, the author presents the Hispanic folk music of the Southwestern United States in all its rich variety. This is truly a panoramic survey of Hispanic folk music, including representation of every formal type and dozens of subjects, both secular and religious, from Arizona, California, Colorado, New Mexico, and Texas. Ethnomusicologists and folklorists will value this comprehensive work both for its unrivaled scope and for its musical emphasis. Those exploring Hispanic cultural heritage will find this book a treasure trove".

== UNM John Donald Robb Musical Trust ==
Upon the deaths of Robb and his wife, Harriet, in 1989, the Trust was established at the University of New Mexico College of Fine Arts by a self-supporting endowment. Managed by an all-volunteer board of directors, the Trust in collaboration with UNM works to further his inspiring commitment to education, and to advance the understanding of music in the Southwest by supporting the performance of Hispanic folk songs, along with the performance, study, promotion, and dissemination of Robb's own music.

Among its initiatives, the Trust co-sponsors the annual UNM John Donald Robb Composers' Symposium (see details below). The Trust also supports the biennial UNM John Donald Robb Commission Competition, which is open to composers from around the world. All entries must be built on folk-song source material from the John Donald Robb Archive of Southwestern Music. The winning composition is performed during the following UNM Composers' Symposium. Past recipients have included Carl Donsbach (2004: Palomita: Canción for Piano Trio); Gary Smart (2008: Song of the Holy Ground for piano and string quartet); Colin Holter (2010: The Recording You Will Now Hear for piccolo, contrabass clarinet, clarinet, piano, vibraphone, violin and cello); Paul Clift (2012: 1950c for restrung classical guitar); Luke Dahn (2014: Buffalo Dance for alto saxophone and piano); Marta Gentilucci (2016: Dance, for flute, clarinet, violin, viola, cello, piano and percussion); and Kyong Mee Choi (2018: "Adiós a lo conocido" (Goodbye to the known) for violin, clarinet, saxophone, bassoon, piano, and percussion). In addition, the Trust supports a graduate assistantship and small grants that advance the mission of the Trust.

== UNM John Donald Robb Composers' Symposium ==
The Composers' Symposium brings internationally acclaimed composers to the UNM campus every spring for four days of concerts, masterclasses, and seminars in one of the longest-running festivals of new music in the world. The symposium began in 1972 when UNM Music Professor William Wood invited his former teacher, Norman Lockwood, to the campus, where his compositions were performed, along with the works of UNM music composition students. In 1999, the symposium was renamed the John Donald Robb Composers' Symposium. The symposium is now presented jointly by the Trust and the UNM Department of Music.

Included among the many distinguished guests have been Milton Babbitt, John Cage, Raven Chacon, Michael Colgrass, George Crumb, Joseph Daley, Julio Estrada, Lukas Foss, Alan Hovhaness, Karel Husa, Betsy Jolas, Ernst Krenek, John Lewis, Gordon Mumma, Thea Musgrave, Pauline Oliveros, Hilda Paredes, Vincent Persichetti, Ned Rorem, Joan Tower, Cecil Taylor, August Read Thomas, Hans Tutschku, Hildegard Westerkamp, Christian Wolff, and Chen Yi.

Recent directors of the Symposium have included Christopher Shultis and, since 2012, Co-Artistic Directors Peter Gilbert and Karola Obermüller. Symposia have changed focus to a more interdisciplinary and theme-oriented format, including "Here Comes Everybody": A Celebration of the New Mexico Centennial was the theme of the 41st annual festival, which featured the contributions of New Mexico composers, both past and present (2012); the centenary of Igor Stravinsky's Rite of Spring (2013); the centerpiece of the 43rd annual Composers' Symposium was Cuatro Corridos, a one-hour chamber opera that told the true story of women trapped in a cycle of prostitution and slavery across the U.S.-Mexico border (2014); Musical Retellings explored folk and classical music in new ways (2015); Indigenizing Art Music: Experiencing the sound of Native American influences in new music (2016) featured guest composers Curt Cacioppo, Raven Chacon, Valerie Naranjo, Trevor Reed, and Christopher Shultis; the 46th annual John Donald Robb Composers' Symposium was a festival of contemporary music that brought together forty-seven composers and numerous ensembles and soloists from around the globe (2017), while the 2019 edition hosted the Society of Composers, Inc. National Conference.

In 2020, Egbert Hiller, producer at the Deutschlandfunk, presented a 40-minute feature on the Composers' Symposium and the New Music scene in New Mexico and published an article in the Neue Zeitschrift für Musik that discusses the Symposium in the context of New Music in New Mexico.

== Recordings ==
- Symphony Number One & Concerto for Viola and Orchestra; Dariusz Korcz, Viola, National Polish Radio Symphony Orchestra conducted by David Oberg; 2003; Opus One
- Pictures of New Mexico; Tatiana Vetrinskaya, Piano (1998); Triangulum;
- Hispanic Folksongs of New Mexico; John Donald Robb, Art Songs; Leslie Umphrey, Soprano, National Polish Radio Symphony Orchestra conducted by David Oberg; 2006; Opus One
- Piano Concerto, Tatiana Vetrinskaya, Piano; Hayg Boyadjian, Second Symphony; National Polish Radio Symphony conducted by David Oberg; 2003; Opus One
- Elegy for our War Dead and Scenes from a New Mexico Mountain Village in addition to works by Michael Mauldin and Hayg Boyadjian; National Polish Radio Symphony Orchestra conducted by David Oberg; NEED DATE, Opus One
- J. D. Robb Rhythmania: Electronic Music from Razor Blades to Moog (1970), Smithsonian Folkways
- Rhythmania and other Electronic Musical Compositions (1976), Smithsonian Folkways
