= Soaring Eagles Dance Group =

Native American cultural institution

The Soaring Eagles Dance Group is an organization that teaches American Indian students from grades K-12 to powwow dance. The children put on exhibitions of cultural dance while wearing tribal regalia for audiences across Southern California. The aim of the program is to preserve traditions and culture through education of Native American youth.

== History ==
The Soaring Eagles Dance Group was founded by Randy Edmands, Roy Cook, and Vickie Gambala in 2008. The group was created by them to do something for the children and community in order to bring urban natives together. At first the classes took place in a community hall in North Park but eventually grew and moved to the Ballard Parent Center in Old Town, San Diego.

Chuck Cadotte has been with the group since the creation and is the main Staff Instructor. Cadotte instructs a weekly powwow dance class and teaches American Indian Youth traditions through these dance classes.

== Approach ==
The Soaring Eagles community, parents, children, and teachers support each other in dance, school, and extracurricular activities. The program stresses the importance of family, community, and communication. The dance classes are about more than teaching children to dance;they make sure the students understand what goes on at a powwow and how to culturally participate. The Soaring Eagles dances symbolize the artistic and nature-influenced spirituality that has been based down through Native history.

== Events ==
The Soaring Eagles performed and participated at the SCAIR Tribal Urban Awards on the Viejas Dreamcatcher theater stage in 2009.

At the 40th annual Barona Powwow on September 5, 2010 a La Mesa sixth-grader, part of the Soaring Eagles, did a dance for a group of Native American Youth. The Barona powwow was a social event with dance competitions and food tasting. Amount the performances and competitions the Soaring Eagles performed for the attendees .

At the 4th annual South Bayfront Powwow dance and ceremony on August 2, 2015, The Soaring Eagles performed the Gourd Dance- the first of many performances to come. The event spanned over two days and celebrated Native American culture through dances, songs, prayers, etc. Powwows like the South Bayfront Powwow are community events that feel like family gatherings. Everyone is welcome to join in the festivities and watch the Soaring Eagles perform.

The Soaring Eagles participated in the 37th Annual Martin Luther King Jr. Parade in 2017. They were accompanied by Green River Singers and the San Diego Inter-Tribal Youth Council.

== Media ==
“Soaring Eagles” is a student-produced documentary about the cultural and education program of San Diego Unified School District’s Indian Education Program. In 2011 the documentary won the Award of Merit from The Indie Fest for its coverage of participants, testimonials and footage from traditional American Indian dance exhibitions.

== Awards ==
The Soaring Eagles placed in 3rd at the San Diego Martin Luther King Day Parade in January 2010. The Soaring Eagles had four winners at the Barona Powwow in 2010: Baltazar Jackson, Violet Decrane, Richard Decrane, and SDAIHC-Charlene Redner.
