= Kiowa music =

Music genre

Kiowa music is the music of the Kiowa Tribe of Oklahoma. The Kiowa are a federally recognized tribe, meaning they have a functioning government-to-government relationship with the United States government.

== Development and genres ==
Historically, Kiowa music has been strongly focused on dancing, such the gourd dance. Mock sham battles, purifying sweat baths, erecting the center cottonwood pole, building the arbor, bringing the brush in, spreading sand on the ground, building the sacred Taimé altar, unveiling the Taimé by the Taimé keeper, distribution of shields, ritual body painting, leading in the different pledge makers/dancers by their clans accompanied by their painters, prayer, speeches, dancing, eagle whistle blowing, visions and feasting by the pledge makers'/dancers' families were all ceremonial elements integral to the four-day k'aw-tow. Modern songs called Brush Dance songs and Buffalo Dance songs commemorate the now outlawed Kiowa Sun Dance.

Kiowa music, one of the most heavily recorded tribes, is part of the larger Southern Plains Indian music genre. The Kiowa created their flag song to honor warriors of the past, present and their people, their memorial song and the dance bustle in the O-Ho-Mah Lodge warrior society from the Omaha tribe. The modern gourd dance adheres to Kiowa protocol and social mores with the majority of songs composed and/or handed down from Kiowa song makers. The Smithsonian Institution made recordings during the 1930s, 1940s, and 1950s that are close to 19th century music, while Indian House Records and Canyon Records began commercial recording in the 1960s and 1970s and Soundchief began recording in the 1940s. Early 20th Century Kiowa recordings are housed in the Library of Congress's Archive of Folk Culture, Indiana University American Indian Studies Research Institute, The Oklahoma Historical Society's Oklahoma History Center, and the Kiowa Tribal Museum. Many Kiowa elders also retain a vast knowledge of traditional songs. New Kiowa songs continue to be composed each year for new events, organizations and individuals.

Much of Kiowa music is related to the warrior societies of the 20th century. Society songs of the 19th century have been integrated into existing music. The Kiowas significant contributions to world music include the maintenance of cultural institutions and practices, such as the Black Leggings Society, the Oh-Ho-Mah Lodge, the Kiowa Gourd Clan, Peyote songs, War Journey songs, also known as 49 songs, war mother songs, victory or scalp dance songs, handgame songs, and hymns.

== Kiowa singers and musicians ==
Spencer Asah (ca. 1905/1910–1954) and Jack Hokeah (ca. 1900/2-1969) were powwow singers, and Stephen Mopope (1898-1974) was an accomplished Native American flute-player. Cornel Pewewardy (flautist Comanche/Kiowa) is a leading performer of Kiowa/Southern Plains music, including Kiowa Christian hymns which include prominent glissandos. Contemporary Kiowa musicians include Kiowa/Comanche flutist Tom Mauchahty-Ware and Terry Tsotigh, flutist. Both Tom and Terry have their own bands and perform nationally.

Prominent contemporary powwow drums led by Kiowa singers include the Cozad Singers, Bad Medicine Singers, Zotigh Singers, and Thunder Hill Singers. All four drum groups have won the prestigious Gathering of Nations Southern Challenge.
