= Christine Ohlman =

American singer-songwriter

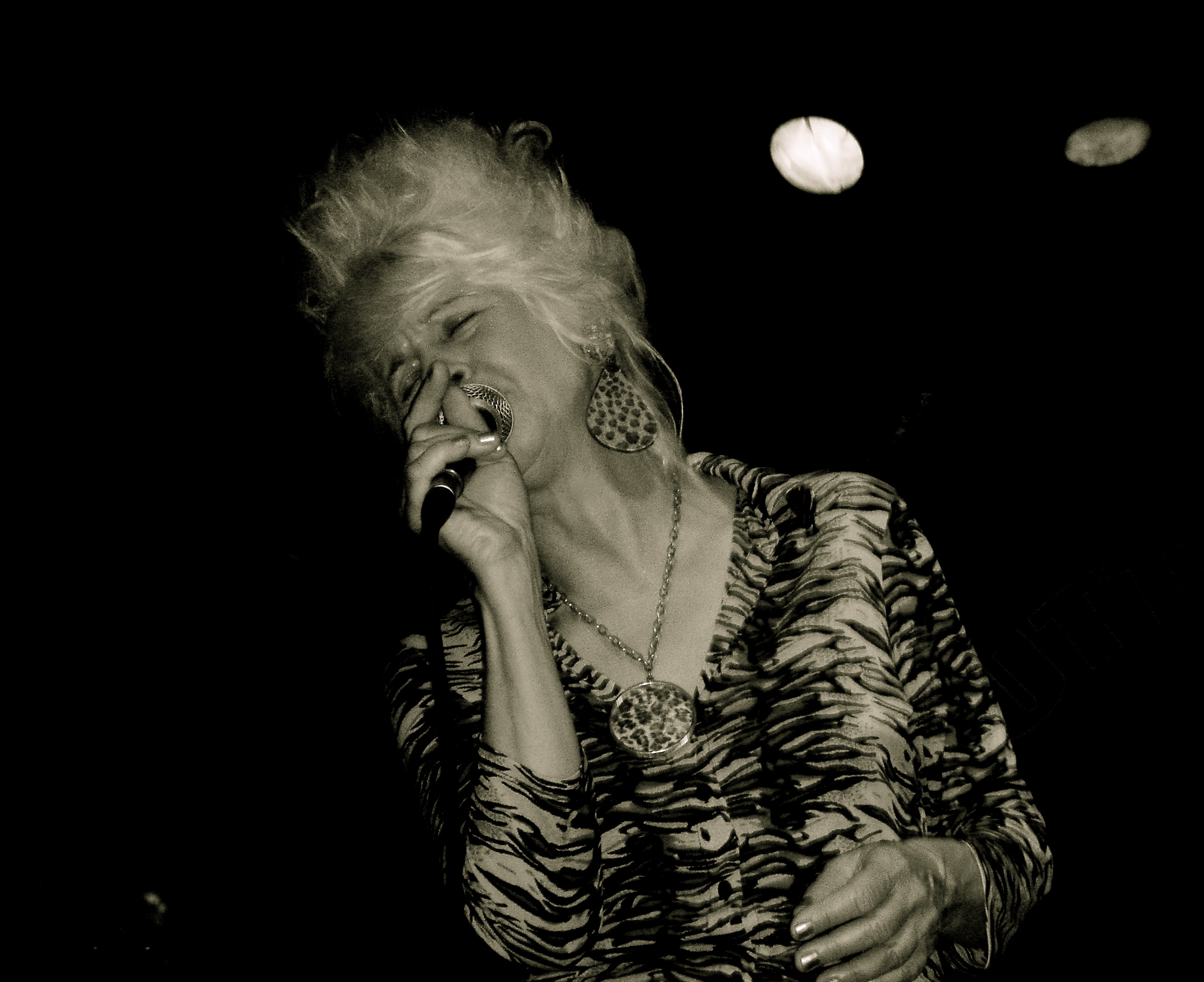
- Ohlman performing in 2006

Background information
- Birth name: Christine Ohlman
- Also known as: The Beehive Queen
- Born: November, 25, 1950; New York City, New York, United States
- Genres: Contemporary music
- Occupation(s): Musician, songwriter
- Instrument(s): Vocals, guitar
- Years active: 1991–present
- Labels: HMG Records

Christine Ohlman (born November 25, in the Bronx, New York City) is an American singer, songwriter, guitarist, recording artist, music scholar. Her nickname "The Beehive Queen" refers to her distinctive platinum beehive. She leads the band Christine Ohlman and Rebel Montez, consisting of Michael Colbath (bass), Larry Donahue (drums), Cliff Goodwin (guitar), founding member and guitarist (Eric Fletcher) (died in 2006) with whom she has recorded six albums. Additionally, she has been the long-running vocalist for the Saturday Night Live Band for over 30 years, and appears annually at the W.C. Handy Music Festival in Florence/Sheffield/Muscle Shoals, Alabama.

== Background ==
Christine's recording career began at age 16 with the New Haven, Connecticut-based band The Wrongh (sic) Black Bag recording a version of the Blues Project's "Wake Me, Shake Me" for the Mainstream Records owner/producer Bob Shad. Relocating to Connecticut and working out of a studio in Wallingford, Connecticut (initially called Syncron Sound and now known as Trod Nossel), Ohlman next fronted a group called Fancy with her brother Vic Steffens, releasing an LP "Fancy Meeting You Here" and a 45 "All My Best" on the Poison Ring label. She overdubbed backup vocals for the Rolling Stones' Metamorphosis album and developed a lifelong friendship with Rolling Stones producer Andrew Loog Oldham. She later sang on the Oldham-produced Essence to Essence (by Donovan) and edited the second installment of Oldham's autobiography 2Stoned.

=== Associations ===
Christine was a founding member of The Scratch Band when Fancy evolved into that band's incarnation, a seven-member unit which later pared down to five. The Scratch Band, including members G. E. Smith and Mickey Curry, were noted throughout the Northeast for their incendiary live shows (not to be confused with The 77s-The Savage-Young Scratch Band). She later reunited with both Smith and fellow Scratch Band member Paul Ossola when she joined the Saturday Night Live (SNL) Band for the 1991–1992 season.

== Saturday Night Live ==
Christine Ohlman became the lead vocalist for the Saturday Night Live Band in 1991. She appeared with Reverend Al Green on the show's 25th anniversary special. Lenny Pickett, music director for Saturday Night Live, said "Ms. Ohlman was, at the time she entered the SNL Band, responsible for selecting much of the band's vintage rhythm and blues repertoire."

== Releases ==
In addition to her own releases, she has contributed to the CDs of Eddie Kirkland, Charlie Musselwhite (Grammy nominated "One Night in America"), Kenny Neal, Ian Hunter, Black 47, and Big Al Anderson. She has appeared on CDs paying tribute to The Rolling Stones (Exile on Blues Street), Nick Lowe (Labour of Love: The Songs of Nick Lowe), Willie Dixon (The Songs of Willie Dixon), and the Grammy nominated A Tribute to Howling Wolf, which includes her duet with Eddie Shaw. The Howling Wolf tribute and Eddie Kirkland's Lonely Street were both co-produced by Christine's mate of many years, the late Thomas "Doc" Cavalier, who also co-produced Christine's first four CDs and is memorialized in The Deep End's poignant number "The Gone Of You." Dave Marsh noted that listeners will find that, in The Deep End, "there are so many 'wow' moments."

Highlights of Ohlman's live guest appearances include: the 1992 Bob Dylan's 30th anniversary at Madison Square Garden (with George Harrison, Chrissy Hynde, and the O'Jays); the 2003 Central Park Summerstage Year of the Blues tribute to Janis Joplin, where Christine joined Phoebe Snow, Kate Pearson and others in fronting both Big Brother & The Holding Company and the Kozmic Blues Band; the 2008's tribute to Bill Withers (with Jim James, Nona Hendryx and the Persuasions); and the 2009 Barack Obama Presidential Inaugural Gala.

Her numerous regular charitable appearances include participation in The Casey Cares Foundation (of Baltimore Maryland) and their Rock 'n Roll Bash (with cohorts Mark Rivera, Bruce Kulick, Hugh MacDonald, Nils Lofgren, Jeff Carlisi, Steve Conte and Andy York). Her contributions to the post-Katrina catastrophe in New Orleans include her participation in the planned 2010 digital re-release of the compilation Get You A Healin' which will feature a track from The Deep End called "The Cradle Did Rock" to benefit the New Orleans Musicians Assistance Foundation and the New Orleans Musicians Clinic.

She worked on a musical, Welcome To The Club, with Cy Coleman and A. E. Hotchner.

=== Re-Hive (2008 Release) ===
In 2008, Christine Ohlman & Rebel Montez completed their compilation CD, Re-Hive, containing previously released and unreleased tracks featuring Grammy Award winning performers Andy York, GE Smith, and Shawn Pelton. The album is dedicated to the memory of its producer, Doc Cavalier, "in whom the renegade heart of rock n'roll burned true."

Christine Ohlman – lead vocals, acoustic and electric rhythm guitars
Michael Colbath – bass
Larry Donahue – drums and percussion
Cliff Goodwin – lead guitar (tracks 3 & 10)
Eric Fletcher – lead electric guitar, acoustic guitar (except track 3 & 10)

Track 1 – "Wicked Time" from Wicked Time released 2000
Track 2 – "A Shot of You" from The Hard Way released 1995
Track 3 – "Dimples" (previously unreleased) 2008
Track 4 – "Sugar Melts" from The Hard Way released 1995
Track 5 – "Turn" from Wicked Time released 2000
Track 6 – "The Hard Way" from The Hard Way released 1995
Track 7 – "When the Summer Goes" (alternate version) from Wicked Time released 2000
Track 8 – "Bound" from Strip released 2003
Track 9 – "Then God Created Woman" (live recording 2003) from The Hard Way released 1995
Track 10 – "The Storm" from The Strip released 2003
Track 11 – "Circle 'Round the Sun" (alternate version) from Wicked Time released 2000
Track 12 – "Edge of the World" from The Hard Way released 1995
Track 13 – "One More Thrill" from Wicked Time released 2000
Track 14 – "Charmaine" (previously unreleased) 1984
Track 15 – "It Tears Me Up" (previously unreleased live demo) 1991

=== The Deep End (2010 Release) ===
Her most recent release is 2009-2010's The Deep End which includes duets with Dion DiMucci, Marshall Crenshaw, and Ian Hunter along with guest appearances by: Andy York (the record's producer), G. E. Smith, Eric Ambel, Levon Helm, Big Al Anderson, Vic Steffens (Executive Producer), and Catherine Russell. The Rebel Montez appear on nine of the CDs 15 tracks. The CD was released on HMG Records. It is reported that Ohlman's "The Cradle Did Rock" will appear as a bonus cut to the digital reissue of Get You A Healin' , which will benefit the New Orleans Musicians' Clinic.

== Early work ==
On Big Sound Records, she appeared on The Scratch Band LPs The Scratch Band (a six-song EP in the States, later released in Germany on KukKuk Records with two additional tracks and on London Records in the UK with 10 tracks total) and "Rescue". She also appeared on a compilation called Bionic Gold, released in the UK as Big Sound For A Small World, with labelmates Mick Farren and others. Ohlman's solo recording career began in 1995 with the release of The Hard Way on the Deluge label. The title track of this CD later appeared in the 2008n Lifetime Channel original film, Sex And Lies In Sin City. "Musical treasures like this don't come along very often" wrote author/musician Cub Koda (1995)-3. Charles M. Young pithily observed "The first thing you notice is her tough, rousing, sexy voice" (1995)-4.

Ohlman recorded a live version of "The Hard Way" (with additional cuts) at the studios of WPKN in Bridgeport, Connecticut (titled "Radio Queen").
