= Circle (Indigenous album) =

Studio album by Indigenous
- Released: 2000
- Label: Pachyderm Records
- Producer: Doyle Bramhall, Indigenous

Indigenous chronology
Live at Pachyderm Studios (1999)	Circle (2000)	Long Way Home (2005)

Circle is an album by the American band Indigenous, released in 2000. It won a Nammy Award, in the "Best Blues and Jazz" category.

The album peaked at No. 3 on the Billboard Blues Albums chart.

== Production ==
The album was produced by Doyle Bramhall and the band; Bramhall also wrote two songs. Indigenous met Bramhall when they opened a 1995 concert for him. The album cover art was created by Alton Kelley.

All four bandmembers contributed to the songwriting. Jennifer Warnes sang on "The Moon Is Shining". Tower of Power's Roger Smith played keyboards.

== Critical reception ==
Professional ratings
Review scores
Source	Rating
AllMusic	3/5 stars
Rolling Stone	3/5 stars

The Washington Post called the guitar work "a potent mix of '60s influences translated into a passionate, contemporary sound." Rolling Stone wrote that the band's "gritty, workmanlike rock is solid and unpretentious, as well-schooled in its influences as it is earnest in execution."

The Hartford Courant deemed the album "an adequate disc with competent musicianship, but most of the songs are formulaic and Circle ultimately lacks flair." The Courier News called it "heavy [and] soulful," writing that Indigenous "combines its native rhythms with the Texas blues-rock of Stevie Ray Vaughan."

AllMusic wrote that "Mato Nanji is a flawless guitar player, but his prowess here is slightly dampened by the acoustic guitar that lies a layer beneath some of the songs, resulting in less punch."

== Track listing ==
1. "Little Time" - 3:19
2. "Can't Keep Me from You" - 4:19
3. "You Left Me This Mornin'" - 4:58
4. "Evolution Revolution" - 2:33
5. "You Were the One" - 5:24
6. "Stay With Me" - 5:11
7. "Seven Steps Away" - 5:20
8. "Remember" - 4:04
9. "Rest of My Days" - 4:58
10. "Waiting for You" - 5:09
11. "The Moon Is Shining" - 4:46
