= Cozad Singers =

Kiowa drum group

The Cozad Singers are a Kiowa drum group from Anadarko, Oklahoma. The group was founded by Leonard Cozad, Sr. in the 1930s, and consists of Leonard, his sons, grandsons, and other members of the family. Cozad, as they are commonly known, are southern style pow-wow and gourd drum, and have released several albums. They performed on the 2001 Grammy Award for Best Native American Music Album winning Gathering of Nations Pow Wow album, along with 15 other drum groups. Their most recent album, California Pow Wow, was released by SOAR Records in June, 2004, and won the 2005 Native American Music Award for Best Historical Recording.

Cozad won the 1994, 1995, 2000, 2003 & 2010 Southern Challenge drum championship at the Gathering of Nations pow-wow in Albuquerque, New Mexico. They are often the host southern drum at large powwows, including the 1996 Stanford University Powwow and the inaugural National Museum of the American Indian pow-wow in Washington, D.C. in 2002.

Their songs are available on Pow Wow Radio.

== See also ==
- Kiowa music
- Native American music
- Powwow

== Links ==
- facebook page for the Cozad Singers
- Cozad Singers on YouTube
