= Things We Do =

Studio album by Indigenous
- Released: 1 September 1998
- Genre: Rock
- Length: 53:32
- Label: Pachyderm Records
- Producer: Indigenous, Brent Sigmeth

Things We Do is the first album from the band Indigenous, released in 1998 under the Pachyderm Records label.

In 1999, Indigenous won three Native American Music Awards for this record, including two top honors: Album of the Year and Group of the Year.

A video for the lead single and title track, directed by Chris Eyre (acclaimed director of Smoke Signals), won the American Indian Film Festival award and was shown three times at the Sundance Film Festival. The track "Now That You're Gone" peaked at #22 on Billboard's Mainstream Rock chart, making Indigenous one of the first Native American bands to break into that realm. Amazon.com named the band Blues Artist of the Year. Indigenous was featured on broadcast shows such as NPR's All Things Considered, Late Night with Conan O'Brien, CBS Saturday Morningand Austin City Limits. B.B. King became a self-proclaimed fan, and invited the band to join his Blues Festival Tour.

== Track listing ==
1. Things We Do - 4:54
2. Got To Tell You - 4:32
3. Now That You're Gone - 3:54
4. Blues This Morning - 3:24
5. Bring Back That Day - 5:07
6. Nothing I Can Do - 5:46
7. Begin To Wonder - 3:36
8. How Far - 5:11
9. What's Goin' On - 3:32
10. Don't Take Your Time - 3:05
11. Holdin' Out - 5:14
12. Another Yesterday - 3:07
