= Julian B =

American rapper

Julian B (born c. 1972) is a Native American rapper.

Julian B is originally from Oklahoma and is of Muskogee heritage. His music is frequently political, with lyrics reminiscent of those of the rap group Public Enemy, and often focusing on the effects of colonialism on the indigenous peoples of the Americas.

He has performed at the Montreux Jazz Festival in Switzerland, as well as at many Native American festivals such as the Red Nations Celebration in Los Angeles, the American Indian Movement Anniversary Celebration in Minneapolis, and various pow-wows across North America. He also performs in support of causes such as Black Mesa and the Zapatistas, as well as at events focusing on the Native American mascot controversy.

He has released two CDs, Once Upon a Genocide (1994) and Injunuity. (2002). He recorded with the Gap Band in 1990.

In 1998, the Native American Music Awards nominated him in the Best Hip-Hop Album category, and his Injunuity was nominated for Best Rap/Hip Hop Recording in 2002.

Very unusually for Native American rappers (most of whom prefer to rap in English), Julian B has experimented with rap in the Muskogee language.

== Discography ==
- 1994 - Once Upon a Genocide (Warrior)
- 2002 - Injunuity (Hot Commodity)

== Bibliography ==
- O'Brien, Jill. "Julian B. raps about staying on the Red Road." Indian Country Today (Lakota Times), January 1995.
- Interview in The Plain Dealer, October 11, 1996, p. 23, sec. SU.
