= Saturday Night Live Band =

House band of Saturday Night Live

- Also known as: The Live Band; NBC Saturday Night Live Band; NBC Live Band
- Origin: New York City, U.S.
- Years active: 1975–present
- Members: Leon Pendarvis; Alex Foster; Lenny Pickett; Steve Turre; Christine Ohlman; Shawn Pelton; Valerie Naranjo; James Genus; Ron Blake; Tuffus Zimbabwe; Maddie Rice; Summer Camargo
- Past members: See below

The Saturday Night Live Band (referred to in the closing credits as The Live Band) is the house band of the NBC television program Saturday Night Live (SNL).

== Role on Saturday Night Live ==
The band consists of mostly jazz, R&B, and some rock musicians and features a strong horn section. They normally play the opening theme music (after the cold open), musical pieces in between commercial breaks, and the closing theme music "Closing Theme (Waltz in A)," written by founding member Howard Shore. Often, the band will provide the music to a sketch when necessary.

== Band leaders and musical directors ==
Musician and future Academy Award winning film composer Howard Shore was the original musical director and bandleader from 1975 until 1980. Paul Shaffer (himself, one of the original band members from 1975 to 1980) recounted that Jean Doumanian (who was taking over as the executive producer for season 6 of Saturday Night Live) offered him to be the new musical-director in light of Shore leaving, but he turned it down, citing in part that he did not want to start the show again with a brand new cast, and he felt five years was enough time to do the show.

Singer and songwriter Kenny Vance (who appeared previously as a musical guest on the May 21, 1977 episode) became the musical director for the show's sixth season (1980–81). Original band member and trombonist Tom Malone took over leadership duties under executive producer Dick Ebersol's tenure from 1981 to 1985. Hall & Oates guitarist G.E. Smith came on board as the new musical director once original producer Lorne Michaels returned and stayed in that position until 1995 when lead saxophonist Lenny Pickett was promoted as bandleader.

Katreese Barnes also served as the music director for a time, around the year 2000. Keyboardist Leon Pendarvis (who has been a member of the band since 1980) and guitarist Maddie Rice (who joined the band in 2020) are also musical directors alongside Pickett.

== Other projects ==
Mariah Carey utilized the horn section of the Saturday Night Live Band (Lew Delgatto, Lenny Pickett, George Young, Earl Gardner, and Steve Turre) for her performance of "If It's Over" during her 1992 MTV Unplugged special.

Tom Malone, Lou Marini, and Alan Rubin were members of the Blues Brothers band fronted by SNL cast members John Belushi and Dan Aykroyd. They were also featured in the first Blues Brothers movie, with Malone as a member of fictional lounge act "Murph and the Magic Tones," Rubin as maitre d' of an expensive French restaurant, and Marini as a fry cook at Aretha Franklin's soul food restaurant. Paul Shaffer was also involved in early Blues Brothers performances, but had scheduling conflicts and could not appear in the film, until the sequel.

== Members ==
=== Current members ===
- Leon Pendarvis – keyboards, musical director (1980–present)
- Lenny Pickett – tenor saxophone, musical director (1985–present)
- Steve Turre – trombone (1985–present)
- Alex Foster – alto saxophone (1985–90, 1995–present)
- Christine Ohlman – vocals (1991–present)
- Shawn Pelton – drums (1992–present)
- Valerie Naranjo – percussion (1995–present)
- James Genus – bass guitar (2000–present)
- Ron Blake – baritone saxophone, flute (2005–present)
- Tuffus Zimbabwe – keyboards (2010–present)
- Maddie Rice – electric guitar (2020–present) and musical director (2025–present)
- Summer Camargo – trumpet (2022–present)

=== Musical directors ===
- Howard Shore (1975–1980)
- Kenny Vance (1980–1981)
- Tom Malone (1981–1985)
- G.E. Smith (1985–1995)
- Lenny Pickett (1995–present)

=== Past members ===
Founders

- Bob Cranshaw – bass guitar (1975–80; died 2016)
- Lew Del Gatto – baritone saxophone (1975–79, 1985–2005)
- Cheryl Hardwick – keyboards (1975–80, 1985–2000; guest 2015)
- Howard Johnson – bass saxophone, tuba (1975–80; died 2021)
- Bert Jones – electric guitar (1975–79)
- Tom Malone – trombone, trumpet (1975–85)
- Lou Marini – tenor saxophone (1975–83)
- Alan Rubin – trumpet (1975–83; died 2011)
- Paul Shaffer – keyboards (1975–80; guest 1982, 2015)
- Dahaud Shaar– drums (1975–77; died 2018)
- Howard Shore – alto saxophone (1975–80)
- Mauricio Smith – baritone saxophone (1975–77; died 2002)

1970s additions

- Gregory Bloch - violin, mandolin (1977–1979)
- Steve Jordan – drums (1977–78)
- Buddy Williams – drums (1978–85)
- Marcus Miller – bass guitar (1979–81)
- Elliott Randall – electric guitar (1979–80)
- David Sanborn – alto saxophone (1979–80; died 2024)
- Georg Wadenius – electric guitar (1979–85; died 2026)
- George Young – alto and baritone saxophones (1979–80, 1990–95)

1980s additions

- Ray Chew – keyboards (1980–83)
- Ronnie Cuber – baritone saxophone (1980–83; died 2022)
- Lawrence Feldman – alto saxophone (1980–83)
- Neil Jason – bass guitar (1980–83)
- Chris Palmaro – keyboards (1980–83)
- David Spinozza – electric guitar (1980–83)
- Tom Barney – bass guitar (1983–85, 1995–2000)
- Michael Brecker – tenor saxophone (1983–85; died 2007)
- Steve Ferrone – drums (1985–86)
- Earl Gardner – trumpet (1985–2022)
- G.E. Smith – electric guitar (1985–95; guest 2000, 2015)
- Tom Wolk – bass guitar (1985–90; guest 1994; died 2010)
- Chris Parker – drums (1986–91)
- Buster Poindexter – vocals (1986–87; died 2025)
- Tony Garnier – bass guitar (1987–89)

1990s additions

- Matt Chamberlain – drums (1991–92)
- Paul Ossola – bass guitar (1991–95)
- Jane Getter – electric guitar (1995)
- Lino Gomez – baritone saxophone (1995–98)
- Yoshiko Hirashige – electric guitar (1995–97)
- Lukasz Gottwald – electric guitar (1997–2007)

2000s additions

- Katreese Barnes – keyboards (2000–10; died 2019)
- Jared Scharff – electric guitar (2007–20)
