= Chasing the Sun (Indigenous album) =

2006 album by Indigenous

Chasing the Sun is the seventh album by American blues rock band Indigenous. It was released on June 13, 2006, on the Vanguard label. It went to #2 on the Billboard Top Blues Albums chart.

== Track list ==
1. "Runaway" 4:30
2. "I'll Be Waiting" 4:18
3. "Number Nine Train" 4:20
4. "Come on Home" 4:28
5. "Fool Me Again" 4:15
6. "Feel Alright Now" 3:26
7. "The Way You Shake" 3:28
8. "Out of Nowhere" 3:18
9. "Leaving" 6:07
10. "Born in Time" 3:51
