= Steven Alvarez =

American musician

Steven Alvarez is a Mescalero Apache and Yaqui vocalist, percussionist, film and stage producer.

Alvarez was raised in a multi-ethnic military family and grew up in and around many diverse cultures, having been raised on all three coasts of the continental U.S., Hawaii and Okinawa.

He is an artist with hands in many mediums working professionally with symphony orchestras, opera and musical theatre companies and cultural organizations. He produced and executive produced twelve cultural documentary films for the Alaska Native Heritage Center which have been screened internationally at film festivals and broadcast nationally on the American Public Broadcasting System (PBS).

Steven began working professionally as a musician at the age of 16 and worked his way through college performing as both a singer and percussionist. He has worked with numerous bands, combos, pit orchestras and theatre companies for more than 30 years. From 1982 through 1989, he played regularly with the Monterey Symphony and Santa Cruz Symphony Orchestras and performed as a guest artist for the Monterey Jazz Festival in 1983 with jazz artist Bobby Hutcherson. He has recorded local and national radio and television commercials jingles as both a vocalist and percussionist including the 15” Hershey’s Kisses Christmas spot that has run annually since 1989. Steven freelanced as a percussionist and vocalist in the San Francisco Bay Area before moving to Anchorage in 1997.

Steven has performed, music directed or produced than 40 theatre productions and co-founded Theatre Artists United in Anchorage, AK. In 2015, he served as the Artistic Director and Producer of Spirit - the 7th Fire of Alaska, an Alaska adaptation of Peter Buffett's master work Spirit, the Seventh Fire. In 2008, and again in 2018, he co-produced with the Anchorage Symphony Orchestra the world premier of Echoes, a multi-media symphonic composition by Randall Craig Fleischer that couples the indigenous song and dance of Hawaii, Alaska and Native America with a symphony orchestra.

Steven's most notable stage roles include: Jesus and Judas in Jesus Christ Superstar, Che in Evita, The Celebrant in Bernstein Mass and The Evangelist in Bach's St John Passion. He also created and performed an innovative one-man Native American theatre piece that fuses traditional storytelling, contemporary song and film. It debuted at the National Museum of the American Indian and has been performed throughout the country.

From 2000 through 2015, he served in a variety of positions at the Alaska Native Heritage Center directing arts and education, and public programs. Steven currently is the Principal Percussionist with the Anchorage Symphony, the Anchorage Opera, and Anchorage Concert Chorus orchestras. He performed at the 2010 Winter Olympics in Vancouver with Saturday Night Live percussionist, Valerie Naranjo and is a member of the intertribal band Medicine Dream as well as Taagi, Three Sides, a Native classical trio with cellist Dawn Avery and violinist Tara-Louise Montour. He currently serves as the Tribal Administrator for Ugashik Traditional Village.
