= Spencer Battiest =

American singer-songwriter

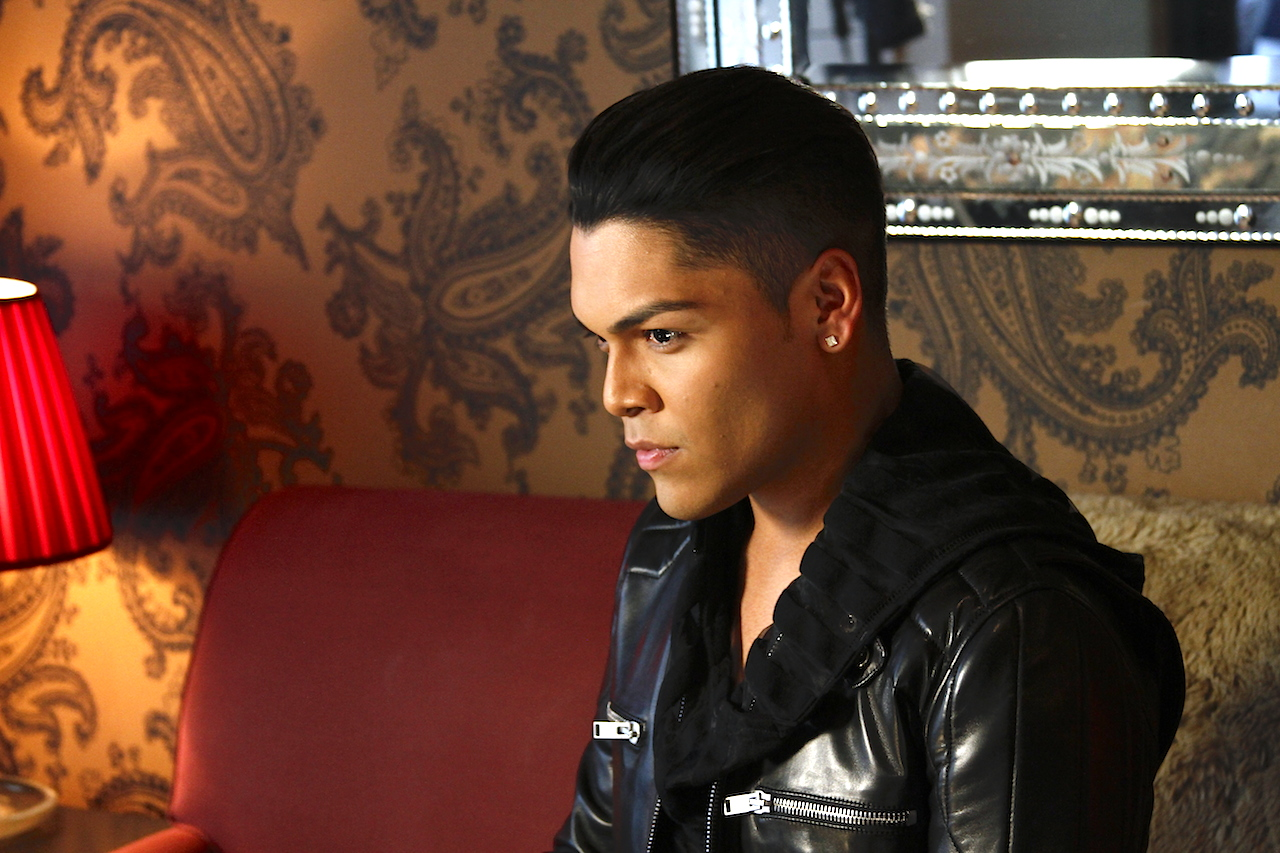
- Born: Plantation, Florida, US
- Citizenship: Seminole Tribe of Florida and United States
- Occupation: Singer-songwriter
- Notable work: "The Storm", "Love of My Life"

Spencer Battiest is an American Indian singer-songwriter, musician, producer, and actor from Hollywood, Florida. In 2013, Battiest became the first American Indian artist to sign with Hard Rock Records. He won best music-video awards for "The Storm" at the American Indian Film Festival and for "Love of My Life" at the Native Cinema showcase.

Signed with Hard Rock Records, he released the EP Stupid in Love in 2015. He has performed at the Calling Festival in London, the Hard Rock Rising festival in Miami, the Hard Rock Rising Barcelona Global music festival, and was the first to perform at the Hard Rock Live amphitheater in Hollywood, Florida.

== Early life ==
Spencer Battiest was born in Plantation, Florida, to June Lena Baker Battiest (Seminole) and Henry Lee Battiest, Jr. (full-blooded Choctaw). He grew up between Broken Bow, Oklahoma, and the Hollywood Seminole Indian Reservation in Florida. He graduated from Hollywood Christian School. Battiest has four sisters and two brothers. His older brother, Zachary, a.k.a. "Doc", collaborates with him on music.

Battiest's first stage performance was at age 4, at his grandfather's church in Broken Bow. His father came from a long line of gospel singers and taught him to sing hymns in his traditional tribal language. His father saw Battiest's interest in singing and groomed him as a vocalist. At age 11, Battiest was invited to sing live during the opening NHL ice hockey game between the Florida Panthers and Chicago Blackhawks. He was invited to sing the US national anthem for boxing matches on Showtime, HBO, and ESPN2.

While attending a Christian school in Hollywood, Florida, Battiest took part in stage plays and musicals. At age 14, he began studying acting, which led to his invitation to audition for IPOP (International Presentation of Performance). Among 1000 children invited internationally to participate, he was chosen among the top 15 and participated in the final showcase production where he won the award for "Best Top Male Teen".

== Music career ==
Without formal training, Battiest continued to sing and study music independently and, through his songwriting, to find deeper connection with his audience. Battiest's musical influences include Stevie Wonder, Barbra Streisand, and Prince.

From 2007 to 2010, Battiest performed at the annual Calling Festival (formerly Hyde Park Calling and Hard Rock Calling) with Stevie Wonder, Aerosmith, Bruce Springsteen, Eric Clapton, Neil Young, Sting and The Police. He played a compilation of pop/rock music for the audience of more than 100,000 at London's High Park arena.

"Whether or not I become a huge success, my goal is to elevate Native Americans and encourage my people to go after their dreams in whatever field they choose, to do it to the best of their ability and at the highest level they can."
—Spencer Battiest

In 2011, Battiest collaborated with his brother Zachary to write and produce "The Storm", a song about the history of his tribe. Its video was directed by Kiowa-Choctaw filmmaker Steven Paul Judd and crewed through a Seminole youth program inviting students to participate in film production. The music video was filmed entirely on the Seminole Reservation in Florida, highlighting historical land, ancestry, and culture. The video garnered the brothers an award for Best Music Video at the 36th Annual American Indian Film Festival. It was also an official selection at ImagineNATIVE in Toronto, Canada, and won an award at the Smithsonian's Santa Fe Native Cinema Showcase. Additionally, it was nominated for three Native American Music Awards (NAMMYs): Best Rap/Hip Hop Recording, Debut Artist of the Year and Song/Single of the Year. The video continues to receive international recognition.

In 2014, Battiest collaborated with Judd to direct the video for his first single with Hard Rock Records, "Love of My Life", filmed in Hollywood, California, and co-produced with Brandon "B" Howard. It was nominated for Best Music Video at the 39th Annual American Indian Film Festival and was nominated for Song Single of the Year and Best Music Video at the 2014 NAMMYs. The video won Best Music Video at the Native Cinema showcase. The video was screened at the 3rd San Diego American Indian Film Festival, the 2015 Talking Stick Indigenous Film Festival and the Museum of New Mexico Media Center's Today's movies.

In April 2015, Battiest and the Osceola Brothers Band performed in Miami, Florida, as part of the first Hard Rock Rising festival in the US with an audience of 52,000. The festival also featured Andrea Bocelli, Jon Secada, and Gloria Estefan.

In the summer of 2015, Battiest performed at the annual Hard Rock Rising Barcelona Global musical festival, opening for Robbie Williams, Kings of Leon, Juanes, Lenny Kravitz, Avicii and Steve Angello. The weekend-long event took place at the Platja del Forum (Parc de la Pau, Sant Adrià de Besòs, Barcelona) on July 24 and 25, 2015. Battiest performed some unreleased songs as well as covers of The Beatles.

Battiest released his debut EP Stupid In Love in 2015 with three original songs entitled: "Mary Jane", "Right Here", and "Over You". In 2019, he collaborated with Melissa B. for the single iTunes release, "Permission to Love".

On October 16, 2019, Battiest and his brother Doc became the first performers to play at the new Hard Rock Live amphitheater at the Seminole Hard Rock Hotel and Casino in Hollywood, Florida.

== Acting career ==
In 2013, Battiest took the lead roles for Native Voices at the Autry's developing plays: Distant Thunder (a Blackfeet musical), The Day We Were Born, and Champ. The same year, he participated in a multimedia project conducted by Navajo filmmaker Pamela J. Peters, Legacy of Exiled NDNZ, which documents young American Indians living in Los Angeles, California, as a tribute to the first generation of relocated Indians of the 1950s. The project expanded to a full-length documentary entitled Exiled NDNZ. The filmmaker documented Battiest's musical career that year and planned to continue for the following two years.
