= Johnny P. Curtis =

American musician (born 1950)

Chief Johnny P. Curtis (born November 28, 1950) of Fort McDowell, Arizona is a member of the San Carlos Apache Tribe. Chief Curtis has been involved in Native American Music since the early gospel music movement of the 1970s. Chief Curtis has produced multiple records within the past thirty plus years. He writes his own original songs and music compositions. In October 2008 Chief Curtis received a Lifetime Achievement Award from the Native American Music Association in Niagara Falls, New York. He is also two time Native American Music Awards winner.
