= Chuck Cadotte =

American powwow dancer

Chuck Cadotte is an American powwow dancer and powwow dance-style teacher. As an enrolled member of the Dakota Standing Rock Sioux Tribe, Chuck is dedicated to supporting Indians in connecting to their cultural roots through teaching traditional Native American dances through the Soaring Eagles dance group, giving traditional blessings and participating in rallies that support Native American land rights and sovereignty.

== Early life and tribal affiliation ==
Chuck Cadotte was born in 1951 in a Bismarck, North Dakota hospital. He is an enrolled member of the Standing Sioux Rock tribe, which experienced Treaty violations on the part of the US government as well as forced displacement of its people and the destruction of its natural resources and economic capacity with the construction and flooding of the Oahe Dam. More recently, the tribe fought the construction of the Dakota Access Pipeline through the No DAPL Standing Rock movement in order to preserve the integrity of its natural resources. The United Nations Office of the High Commissioner has issued statements, which accused the US Security forces of excessive use of force during this time.

For Cadotte, living on the reservation taught him to be humble and respectful of his elders. Cadotte moved from the reservation upon graduating high school in 1970 through a relocation program: Chuck relays, "there were no jobs on the Rez", his house had burned down and his siblings had also moved: his brothers joined the army and Navy and Chuck relocated to Los Angeles.

Cadotte moved in 1977 to San Diego, where he has resided since and been an active member in the Native community.

== Community engagement and activism ==
Cadotte's first encounter with the tension between the US Government and Native American sovereignty came as a member of the Standing Rock Lakota Tribe, which was forcefully displaced from its land with the flooding of the Lake Oahe and the resulting destruction of fauna, and flora that was the tribe's sustenance.

In 1971, Cadotte made a trip to San Francisco to visit his cousin and was given a tour of the Alcatraz occupation. This was, as he relays, his first encounter with Native American activism.

When he moved to San Diego, Cadotte was given the opportunity to give back to the Native community through his involvement with the Sycuan Inter-Tribal Vocational Rehabilitation that helps individuals with disabilities reenter the workforce.

During his time in San Diego, Chuck has also received a Certificate of Completion in the Wellbriety Program and has continued to be of support and service to individuals on their road to recovery from drugs and alcohol.

Cadotte has owned and operated an arts and crafts business for 23 years. It is through this business that he has followed the Powwow trail as an arts and crafts vendor. He has also been an arts-and-crafts instructor for California Indian Education. This involvement with the community has expanded in a tribal member's request for Cadotte to teach Traditional dances to the community.

Cadotte also participates in blessings and cleansings in the Native Community such as at the opening of powwows

== Soaring Eagles dance group ==
The Soaring Eagles dance group started in 2010. As lead instructor, Cadotte teaches Northern Traditional dances to Urban Indian children who want to learn that powwow style of dancing. Cadotte teaches classes on Wednesday evenings at the Normal Heights Community Center. The classes are open to students from kindergarten to 12th grade and also allow parents to participate and connect with their roots. Soaring Eagles serves as a means to sustain Native America culture and urban Indians' connection to their Native American identity.

== Standing Rock and water rights ==
As an enrolled member of the Standing Rock Tribe, Chuck Cadotte represented his tribe during rallies with more than 1000 demonstrators in San Diego in support of the No Dakota Access Pipeline Movement in 2016. As members of the Paiute tribe shared the story of their water being diverted for the use of the city of Los Angeles, leaving their land barren and being forced to relocated to a different location with San Diego Natives, Cadotte realized the US government's use of power in claiming and diverting water. Cadotte's first experience of being a victim of the government taking water was in his family's forced displacement by the Oahe Lake flooding. The Guardian reported at the end of 2016 that "police violence against Standing Rock protestors in North Dakota rose to extraordinary levels". The United Nations Office of the High Commissioner's report brought to light the US Security forces' excessive use of force during the Dakota Access Pipeline stand, as well as the United States government's failure to uphold its treaty obligations with Native American tribes and to provide US citizens access to resources and opportunity according to its obligations as expressed in the International Covenant on Economic, Social and Cultural Rights.
