= Jaynez =

Jovanii Nez, known as Jaynez (born c.1975) is a Navajo American urban R&B singer who and has won awards at the New Mexico Music Awards, and the "Best Debut Artist of the Year" at the 7th Annual Native American Music Awards. Jaynez has also been nominated in the 9th Annual Native American Music Awards. His voice has been described as "soulful".

== Musical career ==
In addition to his solo work, he owns and operates the New Visions record label which was formerly called Dream 1 records. He has also performed with the musical group Dream Team for 20 years (as of 2021); the band is also known as DT. He is one of the originators of the band. Jaynez' musical work has been reviewed in the Navajo-Hopi Observer, among other publications.

Jaynez was profiled in the documentary film, For the Generations: Native Story and Performance.

== Activism and service ==
The Navajo-Hopi Observer reports that he is of Navajo, Cheyenne and Pueblo heritage.

In 2006, he had a meeting with the First Lady of the United States Laura Bush and the Attorney General of the United States Alberto Gonzales to discuss prevention programs for alcohol and drug addictions, and gang violence. He has had first-hand experience with gangs when growing up in Fontana in the Los Angeles area. After a stint in prison, he enlisted in the military. While serving in the Marines, he was involved in four combat operations.

== Visual art ==
Jaynez is also a muralist, and has worked on murals throughout Los Angeles addressing such issues as gang violence and child abuse. He was approached by Snoop Dogg who asked Jaynez and his artist colleagues to paint a mural for Death Row Records, however, the following day Jaynez discovered he was to be shipped out (by the Marines) to fight in Operation Desert Storm.
