= Maddie Rice =

American guitarist

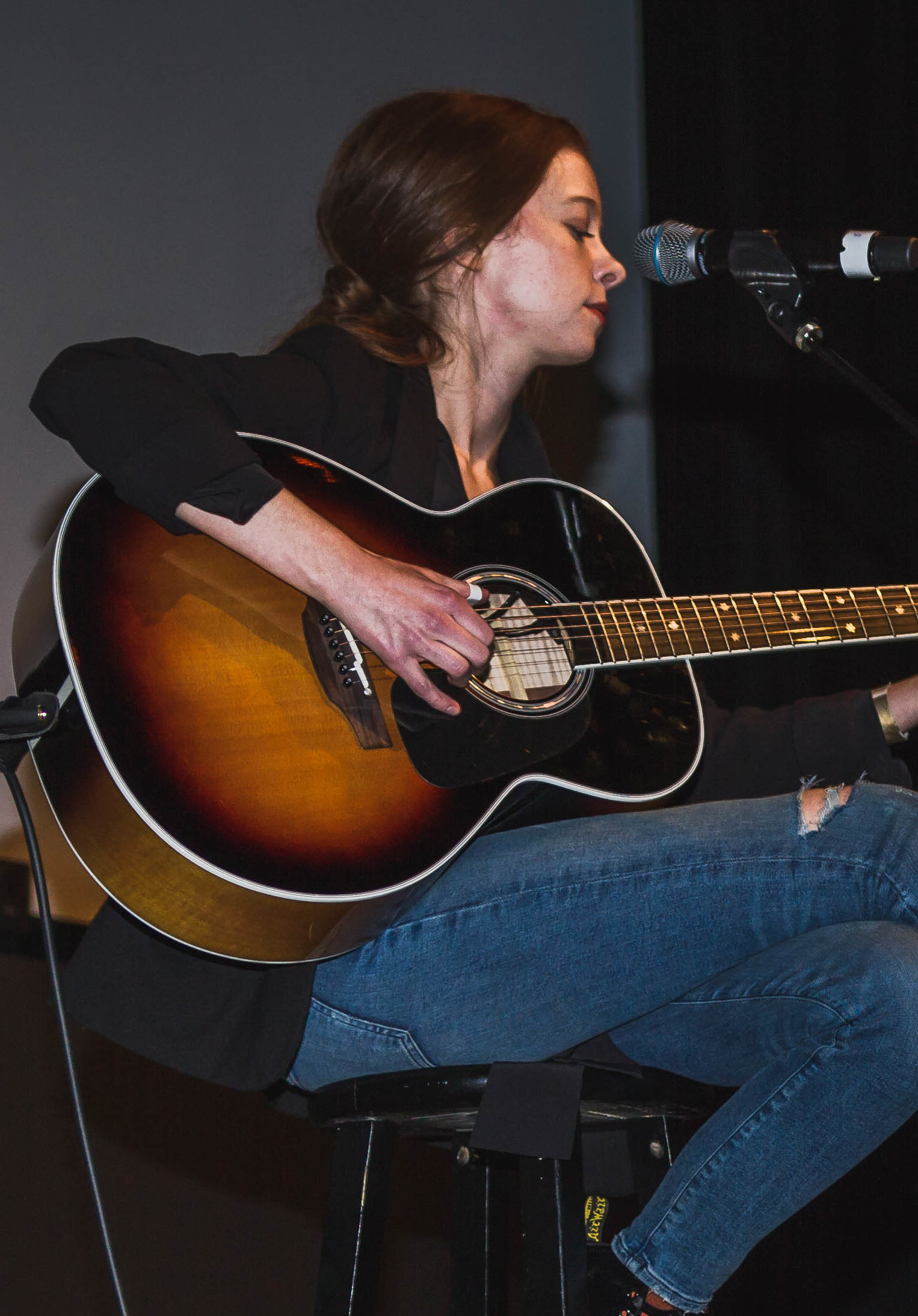
- Maddie Rice performing at the New York Game Awards in 2019
- Born: 1993 (age 32–33); Salt Lake City, Utah, U.S.
- Education: Berklee College of Music
- Occupation: Guitarist
- Website: maddierice.com

Maddie Rice is an American guitarist. She performed several years with Jon Batiste's Stay Human, the house band for The Late Show with Stephen Colbert. She is currently a member of the Saturday Night Live Band.

== Early life and education ==
Rice grew up in Salt Lake City, Utah, and attended Judge Memorial Catholic High School. She started playing guitar at age 13, studying at the School of Rock. Rice moved to Boston, Massachusetts for college, where she enrolled in the Berklee College of Music, graduating in 2014.

== Career ==
In 2015, at the age of 22, she started playing guitar for Stay Human, the house band for The Late Show with Stephen Colbert. Since 2020, she has been a guitarist in the Saturday Night Live Band. In 2025, she was given the additional role as a musical director.

Maddie has toured with various artists, including Korean pop singer Taeyang, indie-dance pop band Rubblebucket and electronic dance music artist Big Wild.
