= Andrew Vasquez =

Native American flute player

Andrew Vasquez is a Native American flute player of the Apache Tribe of Oklahoma. He has released four albums to date, Vasquez, the award-winning Wind River, V3: An American Indian, and Togo, all released by Makoché Records.

== Life ==
Vasquez is Kiowa Apache. His career in entertainment began as a solo Northern Style Traditional dancer with the New York-based American Indian Dance Theater from 1986 to 1991. While on tour, he made a trade for his first flute, and became interested in the instrument. He began to play and was soon creating original compositions.

He was nominated for Native American Music Awards (NAMMY) in 1998 and 1999. In 2000, he won the NAMMY for Best Male Artist. In 2006, he was nominated for Flutist of the Year.

Vasquez lives near Fort Washakie, Wyoming with his wife, Myra and their family. They have four children and two grandchildren.

== Awards and nominations ==
- Various pow-wow and dance titles
- Best Contemporary Native American Album of the Year and Best Album Cover at the 1998 NAV Music Awards for Wind River
- Wind River was also a finalist in the Association for Independent Music (AFIM) 1998 Indie Awards
- Nominated for the 1998 Native American Music Awards (NAMA) Songwriter of the Year and Best Flutist of the Year awards
- Runner-up for 1998's Best Native American Music award from The Coalition of Visionary Retailers (COVR) for Wind River
- Flutist of the Year and Best Male Artist by NAMA in 1999
- Nominated for Best New Age Recording for V3: An American Indian by NAMA in 1999
