= Buddy Red Bow =

American singer-songwriter (1948–1993)

- Born: Warfield Richards; June 26, 1948; Pine Ridge Indian Reservation
- Died: March 28, 1993 (aged 44); Rapid City, South Dakota, US
- Resting place: Christ Church Episcopal Cemetery (Red Shirt)
- Occupations: musician, actor
- Known for: Run, Indian, Run
- Spouse: Cheryl Lynne Oyler (m. 1966)

Warfield Richards Red Bow (June 26, 1948 – March 28, 1993) was a South Dakota Lakotan known for his music.

== Life and career ==
Richards was adopted into the Red Bow family at a young age. He grew up on the Pine Ridge Indian Reservation near Red Shirt, South Dakota, and went to school in Rapid City, South Dakota. He dropped out of high school to become an actor and later served in the Vietnam War as a U.S. Marine in the 1960s.

Red Bow made several records in the 1980s and 1990s as a singer and musician. As an actor, he had minor roles in several Westerns, and a character in the 1989 film Powwow Highway, "Buddy Red Bow", was based on his life.

== Death ==
Red Bow died on March 28, 1993, in the Rapid City Regional Hospital in Rapid City of cirrhosis of the liver, and was buried in Christ Church Episcopal Cemetery (Red Shirt). He was posthumously inducted into the Native American Music Awards Hall of Fame in 1998.

== Discography ==
- Hard Rider (soundtrack, 1972)
- BRB (1981)
- Journey to the Spirit World (1983)
- Black Hills Dreamer (1995)

== Filmography ==
- How the West Was Won (1962)
- Young Guns II (1990) (credited as Chief Buddy Redbow)
- Thunderheart (1992)
