= Klaudt Indian Family =

The Klaudt Indian Family
- Origin: Beaver Creek, ND, U.S. (later Atlanta, GA)
- Genres: Southern Gospel
- Years active: 1929–1982
- Past members: Lillian Klaudt; Vernon Klaudt; Ramona Carpenter; Melvin Klaudt; Raymond Klaudt; Ken Klaudt; Betty Klaudt; Charles Carpenter Pianists; Al David; Mildred Hunter; Jimmy Doan; Mack Evans; Tony Brown; Mel Stewart; David Whorton; Larry Turner; James Clark; Ralph Siebel; Joey Hamby

The Klaudt Indian Family was a professional southern gospel group of partial Native American descent.

== History ==
=== Ethnicity ===
Reverend Reinhold Klaudt was a German cattleman who, in 1929, married Lillian White Corn Little Soldier of the Arikara-Mandan tribe of Indians. She was a direct descendant of one of General Custer's scouts at the Battle of Little Big Horn and also a descendant of Chief Sitting Bull.

=== Performance history ===
Originally from "the badlands of North Dakota," the Klaudt Indian Family consisted of Vernon, Melvin, Raymond, and Ken and Ramona.

The Klaudt Indian Family began performing with Mrs. and Mr. Klaudt, Vernon, Ramona, and Melvin. The other siblings joined the group as the years passed. Reinhold Klaudt left the performing group after several years to concentrate on being the business manager for the group.

The Klaudts settled in the Atlanta area and soon began traveling across the country holding revival services and singing in gospel concerts.

Television was a vital part in the growing popularity of the Klaudt Indian Family. They were fixtures on the syndicated program, Bob Poole's Gospel Favorites.

The Klaudt Indian Family traveled as a group for more than five decades before retiring in the early 1980s. The Klaudts came out of retirement to perform for the last time on the stage of the Grand Ole Gospel Reunion in 1996 which featured Mrs. Klaudt at age 90.

=== Recording Label ===
In addition to their singing, the Klaudt Indian Family also had their own recording label. They recorded several other gospel groups on their Family Tone label.

== Final years and legacy ==
Vernon Klaudt, the oldest remaining member of the Klaudt Indian Family died September 9, 2006.

In the fall of 1990, Kim Klaudt, grandson of Lillian Little Soldier, and his wife founded the World Ministries, a nonprofit, nondenominational ministry as an extension of the original Klaudt family evangelist outreach.

"Lillian Little Soldier Klaudt" was inducted into the Southern Gospel Museum and Hall of Fame.

In 2020, Melvin Klaudt was inducted into the Southern Gospel Music Hall of Fame.
