= Dawn Avery =

Native American composer, cellist and educator

Dawn Avery Ieriho:kwats
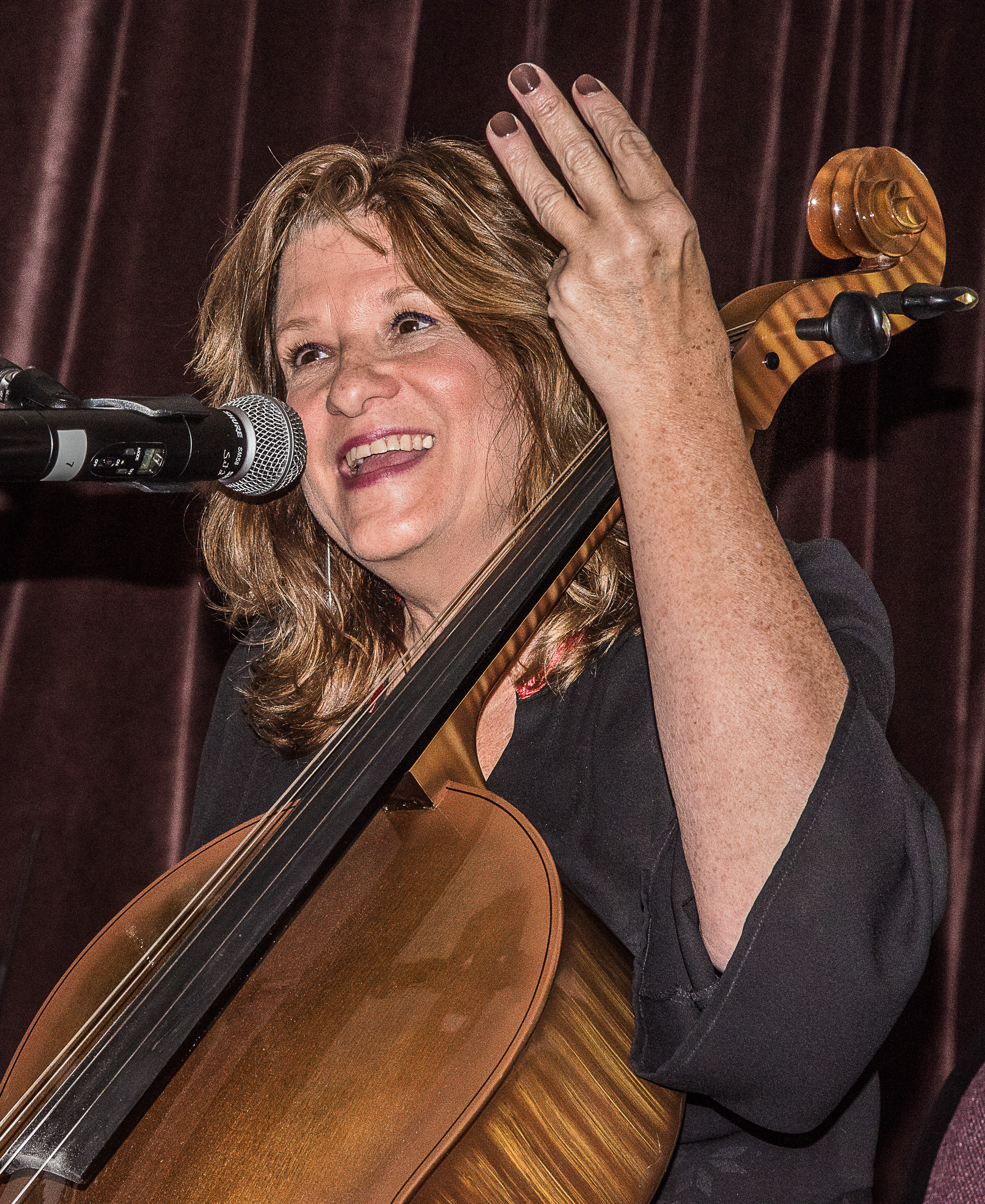
- Avery in 2019

Background information
- Occupations: Composer, cellist, vocalist, educator
- Instrument: Cello

Dawn Avery (Mohawk: Ieriho:kwats) is an American composer, cellist, vocalist, and educator. Her work spans classical and Indigenous musical traditions, as well as genres such as downtempo. She has been described as part of a broader increase in Native American participation in art music in the 1990s.

== Career ==
She is active in indigenous language and cultural preservation as a musician, educator, and participant in Longhouse ceremonies. Avery leads workshops and produces projects as part of the Native Composer's Project. Avery Mohawk's name is Ieriho:kwats and she wears the turtle clan. She has a doctoral degree in ethnomusicology on Native Classical composition and Indigenous theory. Avery is also a professor at Montgomery College. She was awarded the 2012 Maryland Professor of the Year by the Council for Advancement and Support of Education and the Carnegie Foundation for the Advancement of Teaching.

Avery's exploration of sacred music led her to study the relationship between music and spirituality. She has led meditation groups and spiritual music performances at the Esalen Institute, the Omega Institute for Holistic Studies, Milan Sacred Music Festival, the Open Center in NYC, and Musicales Visuales in Mexico City. As a leader of meditation and creativity workshops, Avery has worked with healers such as the Dalai Lama, Rick Jarow, Ron Young, and Hilda Charleton. Rapidly Approaching Ecstasy: Music for Movement and Meditation features world grooves on the Hindu chakras along with a guided visualization track. Alchemy: Music for Meditation features tracks with various world music artists in duets with Avery on cello and voice.

While Avery performs solo, she has additionally collaborated on famous pieces, even receiving a Grammy nomination for her works as a vocalist and cellist on Grover Washington's album Breath of Heaven (1997). Other artists on the album include Luciano Pavarotti, Sting, John Cale, John Cage, R. Carlos Nakai and Joanne Shenandoah. Avery has toured around the world playing Delta blues with the Soldier String Quartet, Persian funk with Sussan Deyhim, and operatic repertoire with the New York City Opera Company. Avery has also toured with the North American Indian Cello Project, in which she premieres contemporary classical works by Native composers. She has received awards for her classical works from Duke University, NYU, Meet the Composer, among others.

In 2023, Avery premiered Sacred World – Onenh’sa at the University of Michigan. It was a new indigenous soundscape work commissioned by Dr. Pamela Ruiter-Feenstra, the visiting carillon professor at the university.

== Works ==
Avery's works are diverse as she explores various different genres. In an interview with Suzanne Gilchrest of 8 Strings and a Whistle, Avery proclaimed that she has been influenced by classical music, world music, rock, and jazz, as well as by musicians such as Ludwig van Beethoven, Coltrane, Pink Floyd, Johnny Whitehorse, and Sting.

Avery's music can be heard on several award-winning films, including Basquiat, the Smithsonian's artwork Always Becoming by Nora Naranjo-Morse, several Rich-Heape Films and the movie Tadpole. Her most recent project and recording 50 Shades of Red features music, dance, film, and ritual. Tara Gatewood of Native America Calling said this downtempo work is a new genre in Native American music.

=== 50 Shades of Red ===
This album was first showcased to the public on October 18, 2014 for the first time at Montgomery College as part of the Department of Visual and Performing Arts on the Takoma Park/Silver Spring Campus as part of the college's Performing Arts Showcase Series. The showcase was an hour-long show, where Avery also incorporated a traditional dance to Down Tempo Native American music. The theme throughout the album is love. Just as the name of the album suggests, it explores the many kinds or "shades" of love from sensual love to spiritual love. Some of her popular songs from this album are "Strawberry Field Forever, My Heart Is Strong," and "My Life with You".

=== Our Fire ===
Her 2012 solo album Our Fire: Contemporary Native American Song won several nominations in the Indian Summer Awards, New Mexico Music Awards, and Native American Music Awards.

Our Fire consists of native contemporary songs, choral chants, jazz, and cello. Avery sings in English and Mohawk as well as playing the cello. Our Fire was nominated for Best Songwriting of the Year by the Native American Music Awards (NAMA). Grammy winner Larry Mitchell played the guitar and produced her album.

=== Alchemy ===
This album is a meditation album that was constructed to instill inner peace and produce renewed energy.

=== True ===
True consists of music around the world in a setting with influences from Africa, Native America, Brazil, Mexico, Greece, and other native places. In this piece Avery sings in many languages. This piece reflects her different styles from around the world. This also includes voice, percussion, cello, and guitar.

=== "Sarabande" or two worlds ===
Avery first performed the Sarabande from Bach's Suite No. 5 for solo cello in C minor, interspersed with, "improvised vocal line in a traditional falsetto style and a Buffalo drum line composer by Avery and performed by Steven Alvarez," and credited to Bach/Avery under the title "Sarabande", which she later performed under the title, "two worlds", which has been described as an example of the "non-interference" as embodied by the Eastern Woodlands wampum belt. Robinson emphasizes the difference between the two styles as a possible refusal or lack of desire or necessity to integrate, while writing with Levine, he and Robinson also discuss the, "unified...naturalize[d] mixtures," although they confirm that Indigenous musicians in writing, specifically R. Wallace and Avery, "often," emphasize, "common philosophies more than similar musical languages," and that this piece forces examination of these topics.
