= Indigenous (band) =

American blues rock band

- Origin: Marty, South Dakota, United States
- Genre: Blues rock
- Years active: 1998–present
- Labels: Pachyderm Records; Vanguard Records; Blues Bureau International (current)
- Members: Mato Nanji; Derek Post; Charles Sanders II
- Past members: Horse; Wanbdi; Pte; Scotti Clifford; Brent Fitz; Chaney Bryant; Michael Bland; Ray Mehlbaum; Jesse Tate; Kris Lager; Jeremiah Wier; Andrew Tyler; ACWright
- Website: http://www.indigenousrocks.com/

Indigenous is an American blues rock group that came to prominence in the late 1990s. The band originally consisted of two brothers, Mato Nanji (Maiari) ('mah-TOE non-GEE' vocals and guitar, born 1974), Pte ('peh-TAY' bass guitar), along with their sister, Wanbdi ('wan-ba-DEE' drums, vocals), and their cousin, Horse (percussion).

Their music is influenced by Stevie Ray Vaughan, Jimi Hendrix and Carlos Santana. Mato Nanji's style and skill has drawn comparisons to each of these guitarists. The band has also shared the stage with artists of varying musical genres such as B.B. King, Santana, Bonnie Raitt, Joan Baez, the Indigo Girls, Jackson Browne, Dave Matthews Band, and Los Lonely Boys. The band has headlined its own tours several times.

The Nakota Nation members grew up on South Dakota's Yankton Indian Reservation, where their father, Greg Zephier became a spokesperson for Native American rights. A musician in his own right during the 1960s and 1970s, Zephier provided his children with records from blues musicians such as B.B. King, Buddy Guy, and Freddie King, and taught them to play their respective instruments. The family started touring together, and soon the children were performing on their own.

== Musical career ==
The group released their debut album, Things We Do on Pachyderm Records in 1998. In 1999, Indigenous won three Native American Music Awards for their debut record, including two top honors: Album of the Year and Group of the Year.

The track "Now That You're Gone" peaked at #22 on Billboard's Mainstream Rock chart. Amazon.com named the band Blues Artist of the Year, and soon after they were featured on broadcast shows such as NPR's "All Things Considered", "Late Night with Conan O'Brien," "CBS Saturday Morning," and "Austin City Limits". B.B. King became a self-proclaimed fan, and invited the band to join his Blues Festival Tour.

Later that year, Indigenous released an EP, Blues This Morning, and an album, Live at Pachyderm Studios in 1999, and continued the momentum. Live at Pachyderm won two Native American Music Awards for Best Blues Album and Group of the Year in 2000. Their next LP, Circle, settled into place in Billboard's Top Blues Albums Chart after its release in 2000.

Following this was the 2003 self-titled album, Indigenous (Zomba), and then another EP, Long Way Home in 2005 (on their own record label). This seven-song EP contains five originals, as well as an acoustic version of a song from Things We Do, "Rest Of My Days", and a live version of their first single, "Things We Do". After recording their 2006 album, Chasing the Sun (Vanguard) the band split. Mato carried on with the Indigenous name and toured with a new line-up that included bassist Chaney Bryant and drummer Ray Mehlbaum in support of the album. In 2008, Mato wrote and recorded the album Broken Lands which was released on August 12, 2008. More recently, the band released The Acoustic Sessions on June 8, 2010.

Time is Coming (2014) was described in reviews as "closer to rock than blues." This follows the last CD entitled Vanishing Americans (2012) that paid homage to Mato's father, Greg Zephier Sr. It is dedicated to indigenous youth and all young people on indigenous reservations. His 10th commercial album, Vanishing Americans, released on Blues Bureau International, a division of the Shrapnel Record Group, won the Native American Music Award's "Album of the Year" award in 2014. The CD honored Zephier, who was a spiritual advisor and spokesperson for the International Indian Treaty Council. Nanji said this about Greg, "he was my favorite musician...I just felt it was time to pay tribute to him and his band."

== Discography and awards ==
Year	Album	Label	Award
1995	Awake	Kiva/The Crow Talent Agency/Indigenous	N/A
1996	Love-In-A-Mist	self-released	N/A
1997	Live Blues From The Sky	self-released	N/A
1998	Things We Do	Pachyderm Records	Native American Music Award for Album of the Year, Group of the Year, and Best Pop Group
1999	Blues This Morning EP	Pachyderm	N/A
1999	Live at Pachyderm Studios	Pachyderm	Native American Music Award for Blues Album of the Year, Group of the Year
2000	Circle	Pachyderm	#3 Billboard Top Blues Albums, #21 Independent Albums
2002	Fistful of Dirt EP	self-released	N\A
2003	Indigenous	Zomba/Silvertone	#3 Billboard Top Blues Albums
2005	Long Way Home EP	Indigenous Records	N/A
2006	Chasing the Sun	Vanguard Records	#2 Billboard Top Blues Albums
2008	Broken Lands	Vanguard	N/A
2010	The Acoustic Sessions	Vanguard	N/A
2012	Indigenous featuring Mato Nanji	Blues Bureau International	N/A
2013	Vanishing Americans	Blues Bureau International	#10 Billboard Blues Albums
2014	Time is Coming	Blues Bureau International	#14 Billboard Blues Albums
2017	Gray Skies	Blues Bureau International	N/A
