= Valerie Naranjo =

Percussionist, performer, composer

- Born: Valerie Dee Naranjo; October 10, 1958 (age 67); Los Angeles, California, U.S.
- Occupations: Percussionist; Composer; Musicologist
- Years active: 1988–present

Valerie Naranjo (born October 10, 1958), is an American percussionist, vocalist, musicologist, and educator known for her association with the Saturday Night Live Band.

A touring musician who has played and arranged for numerous Broadway productions, Valerie has composed for dance and film, and other music in the “world music” category. She specializes in the West African mallet keyboard instrument called “gyil”, and excels at marimba. She created transcriptions of gyil music for western marimbaX, and produced gyil concerti with orchestra, wind ensemble, string quartet, and percussion ensemble. Naranjo was inducted into the Percussive Arts Society Hall of Fame in 2011 and was named World Music Percussionist of the Year in 2005 and 2008 and Mallet Percussionist of the Year in 2012 by Drum! magazine reader poll.

== Early life and education ==
Naranjo was born in Los Angeles. Both parents were Native American; her father was a member of the Southern Ute tribe and her mother had Navajo heritage. Music was an important part of her community and her childhood experience. She started singing and playing percussion at an early age, and began playing piano in high school.

Starting her university studies at the University of Colorado, she took a class with a Ghanaian doctoral student and first learned of the West African gyil. She transferred to the University of Oklahoma and majored in Vocal and Instrumental Music Education. After graduating, she moved to New York City and later pursued a graduate degree at Ithaca College, studying with Gordon Stout.

== Career ==
In New York, Naranjo made many opportunities to establish herself as a working musician. While researching West African percussion keyboard music, she played her 6-foot marimba in the subway system (which resulted in at least two bookings in off-Broadway shows.)

She also freelanced and built connections in a wide and active group of musicians in the city that led to work with such artists as David Byrne, the Paul Winter Consort, Tori Amos, Airto Moreira, to such as touring Europe with The Philip Glass Ensemble between 1988 and 1993. Other performance experience from the first half of the 1990s included work with The Native American Women’s group Pura Fe and Richard Barone.

From 1988 until 2019 Valerie spent 30 summers studying and performing in Ghana. In 1988 her playing of the gyil's traditional repertoire in Ghana's Kobine Festival of Traditional Music led to the declaration of a chiefly decree in the Dagara nation (of Ghana) that women be allowed to play the instrument for the first time, and to become a first-place prize winner in Ghana's Kobine Festival of Traditional Music in 1996.

From 1989 until 2007 she apprenticed with Kakraba Lobi, the Ghanaian gyil master who was a founding member of the Ghana Dance Ensemble. Together they toured the U.S. five times, produced four CDs, and published 15 of his gyil compositions transcribed for Western marimba.

During her annual journeys to Ghana Naranjo also apprenticed with Ghanaian master percussionists, Godwin Agbeli, Ben Armand, and Kofi Misiso, and studied dance with Sulley Imoro and other members of Ghana's National Dance Company. During the 1990s and 2000's she also researched and studied in Botswana, Burkina Faso, Cote D'Ivoire, Egypt, Madagascar, Morocco, and Zambia.

After working on the productions The Tempest, The Green Bird, and Juan Darién, with director Julie Taymor, Naranjo was asked to be a part of The Lion King in 1996. She was an important part of the creation of the show's sound: selecting instruments to be included in the show's orchestra, auditioning musicians, and writing percussion arrangements. Naranjo performed with The Lion King for over 24 years. It is the highest grossing Broadway musical of all time.

Around that same time, in 1995, an old friend and musical collaborator Lenny Pickett asked Naranjo to join the Saturday Night Live Band. Pickett looked to her to bring lively percussive and fresh sounds to the show during a time the show was struggling to maintain its audiences.

She works alongside Shawn Pelton, the drummer, in the band. Her instrument set-up consists of two mallet instruments, chime trees, woodblocks, cymbals, three congas, bongos, djembe, kpanlogo drum, timbales, and a variety of percussion instruments from around the world.

Since 2011, Naranjo has taught in the New York University Steinhardt School's percussion department. She directs the African Gyil and Percussion Ensembles, and coaches West African dance, drumming, and voice. She is also a member of NYU's "Global Institute of Advanced Studies" a think tank which travels with the goal to help NYU professors to have an improved international understanding.

Naranjo has performed in such situations and locations as the 2010 Winter Olympics in Vancouver, The White House (2013 Gershwin Awards-Carole King), Lincoln Center (1994, 1996, 2008) New York City Center (1994), Carnegie Hall (1990, 2009), London's Royal Festival Hall, and The Kennedy Center; and in festivals such as The Bath Festival, Young Indians (New Delhi), FESTIBO (Ivory Coast), Fidanze and Cuba Disco (Cuba), The Grahamstown, and Arts Alive Festivals (South Africa) "Semana de Percusiones" (Peru), Festival De La Marimba 1 and 10 (2000 and 2010) Chiapas, Mexico, and has performed with the Ghana National Symphony in 2018 and 2019 [1] [Song of Legaa liner notes]

== Discography ==
Orenda - Native American Music to Heal the Spirit (Lyrichord Discs) (2000)

Song of Legaa (with Kakraba Lobi and Barry Olsen) (Lyrichord Discs) (2000)

Zie Mwea - Natural Conditions with Bernard Woma and Barry Olsen (MandaraMusic) (2001)

Song of Niira (with Kakraba Lobi and Barry Olsen) (MandaraMusic) (2001)

Da Yillena - Wood that Sings (with Kakraba Lobi and Barry Olsen) (MandaraMusic) (2002)

West African Music for the Marimba Soloist - Valerie Naranjo (MandaraMusic) (2003)

World Music for the Western Percussion Ensemble (MandaraMusic) (2004)

Lewaa's Dream (MandaraMusic) (2005)

Mandara - (with Barry Olsen, B. Carrott, V. Cherico, L. Traversa) (MandaraMusic) (2006)

Ye Suo Barra - The Last Word (with Kakraba Lobi and Barry Olsen) (MandaraMusic) (2008)

Bata Gyil with Africa>West Trio (MandaraMusic) (2017)

=== Other recordings ===
Richard Barone - "Cool Blue Halo" (1987)

Richard Barone "Primal Dream" (1990

Richard Barone "25th Anniversary Concert 2012

Philip Glass Ensemble "Powaqqattsi" 1988

Carabali "Carabali" 1988

Carabali "Carabali 2" 1991

"Jazzin' Universally" recorded in Johannesburg, South Africa with Zim Nqawana, Barry Olsen, Jose Neto, Airto Moreira and others 1995

David Byrne "David Byrne" 1995

Selena "Dreaming of You" 1995

Megadrums "Layers of TIme"1996

David Soldier " Ice - 9 Ballads" 2001

Final Fantasy "The Dream Within" Elliot Goldenthal 2001

Frida "Original Soundtrack " Julie Taymore/Elliot Goldenthal 2002

SYOTOS "Trouble in Paradise" 2003

Sid Whelan "Waiting for Payday" 2019

Eric Mullens "Unexpected Beauty" 2021
