= Lenny Pickett =

American saxophonist (born 1954)

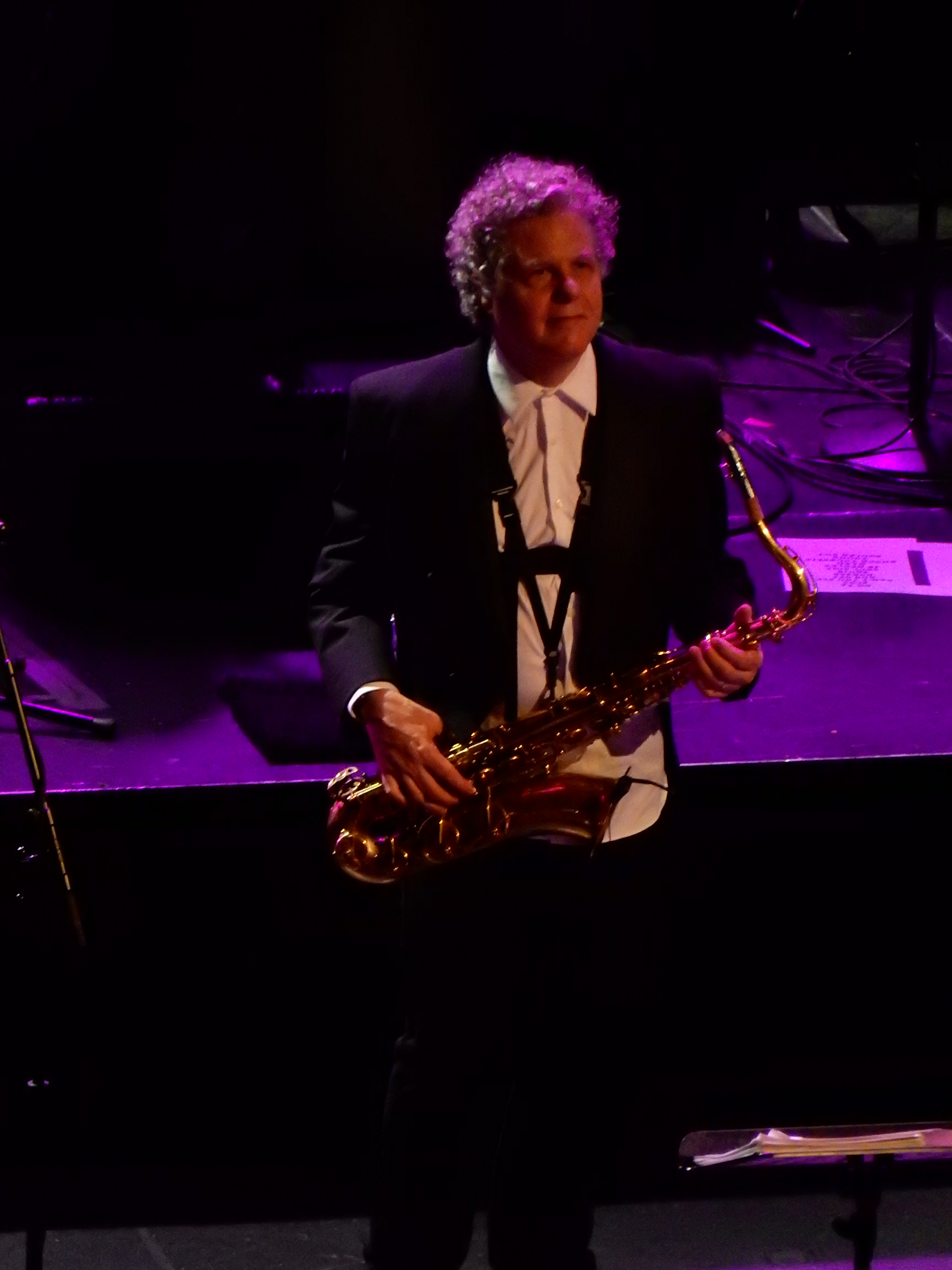
- Pickett in 2018

Background information
- Born: April 10, 1954 (age 72); Las Cruces, New Mexico, U.S.
- Genres: R&B; funk; pop; rock
- Occupations: Musician; arranger; music director
- Instruments: Saxophone; clarinet; flute
- Years active: 1972–present
- Member of: Saturday Night Live Band; The Borneo Horns
- Formerly of: Tower of Power
- Website: lennypickettmusic.com

Lenny Pickett (born April 10, 1954) is an American saxophonist and musical director of the Saturday Night Live band. From 1973 to 1981, he was a member of the band Tower of Power.

== Biography ==
Pickett was born in Las Cruces, New Mexico. In the 1970s and early 1980s, he led the horn section for Tower of Power, a funk band from the San Francisco Bay area. He was also a frequent session band member that backed many musicians in multiple genres, from Elton John to musicians in the soul music, rhythm and blues, and funk music genres. Tower of Power also released its own albums as a group.

Pickett joined the Saturday Night Live Band in 1985 and has served as the band's musical director since G. E. Smith was fired during the cast exodus in 1995.

Apart from Saturday Night Live and Tower of Power, Pickett has worked extensively as a session musician for a wide range of performers and genres.
