= Gourd Dance =

Native American dance

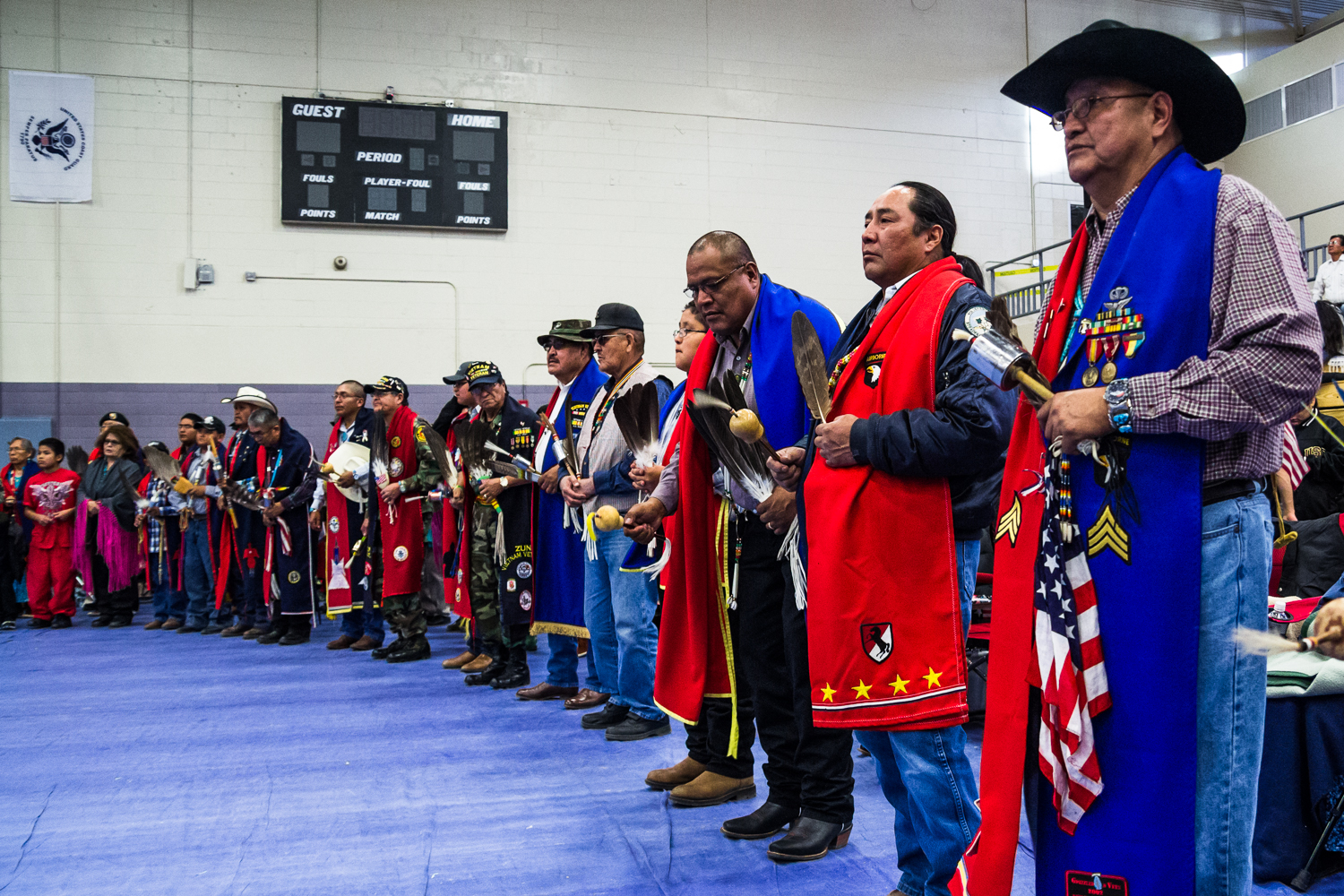
13th Annual NCI New Year's Eve Sobriety Pow Wow and Gourd Dance at the Miyamura High School Gym in Gallup, New Mexico

The Gourd Dance (Kiowa: D̶áiñb̶èg̶ùngyà) is a Kiowa dance and song tradition that has become popular at modern powwows in southwestern Oklahoma.

== Origin legends ==
Many Native Americans dispute the origin of the legend of the Gourd Dance. A Kiowa story recounts the tale of a young man who had been separated from the rest of the tribe. Hungry and dehydrated after many days of travel, the young man approached a hill and heard an unusual kind of singing coming from the other side. There he saw a red wolf singing and dancing on its hind legs. The man listened to the songs all afternoon and through the night and when morning came, the wolf spoke to him and told him to take the dance and songs back to the Kiowa people. The "howl" at the end of each gourd dance song is a tribute to the red wolf. The Kiowa Gourd Dance was once part of the Kiowa Sun Dance (K’áu:d̶ó) ceremony.

== Decline, revival, and organizations within the Kiowa Tribe ==
Beginning in 1890 the United States government began to actively enforce bans on Kiowa cultural ceremonials and the Gourd Dance was out of normal practice by the late 1930s.

In 1957 the Kiowa Director for the American Indian Exposition, Fred Tsoodle, called upon singers Bill Koomsa and William Tanedooah who remembered the Gourd Dance songs. Also called were Clyde Ahtape, Harry Hall Zotigh, Fred Botone, Oliver Tanedooah, and Abel Big Bow in Kiowa Gourd Dance dress to dance to the songs for a special tribal presentation at that year's festivities. Two years later inspired by the presentation several Kiowa men reorganized the Kiowa Gourd Dance Society (D̶áiñb̶ègàu) and formally established the organization on January 30, 1957 and voted on the name "Kiowa Gourd Dance". Within the next decade the organization split into three unrelated branches: the establishing group (now called Kiowa Gourd Clan), Tiah-Piah Society of Oklahoma (established in 1962), and the Tia-piah Society of Carnegie (now known as the Kiowa TiaPiah Society). All three societies hold their annual ceremonials on and around July 4, due to the Gourd Dance at one time being a part of the Sun Dance ceremonials usually held in mid-summer.

The variations on the word "Tia-Piah" used in the names of Kiowa Gourd Dance organizations comes from D̶àiñb̶ègàu (Tdeinpei-gah) [IPA: tãi.pe.gɔ] one of the eight Kiowa warrior societies. Perhaps because of the military connotations of the term the Gourd Dance has often been mistaken for a "veteran's dance". However, leaders of all three of the earliest Kiowa-established gourd dance organizations agree that this is not a requirement to become a member of the societies. Dances from two of the other presently-existing societies, Pòláñ:yop ("Pah-Lye-Up" or "Rabbit Society") [pʰo.laː.hyop] and Óhòmògàu ("Ohomah" or "War Dance Society"), [o.ho.mo.gɔ] are incorporated into the Kiowa summer ceremonials before and after the gourd dance sessions.

== Participation ==
A Warriors (Male) Gourd Dance Eagle Fan. This Gourd Dance fan is made from immature bald eagle feathers. The handle of this fan was made from the branch of a tree struck by lightning, and the handle of the fan has been stitched, bound, and fringed with bison hide.

The Gourd Dance originated with the Kiowa tribe, and is a man's dance. Women participate by dancing in place behind their male counterparts and outside the perimeter formed by the men. The dance in the Kiowa language is called "Ti-ah pi-ah" which means "ready to go, ready to die".

The Kiowa consider this dance as their dance since it was given to them by "Red Wolf". It has spread to many other tribes and societies, most of which do not have the blessing of the Kiowa Elders. Some gourd societies do not distinguish race as a criterion, and even non-Indians can and are inducted into their gourd societies, the Kiowa gourd dance society however only inducts Indians of half blood or more. Many participants may be older men, and the dance is less energetic and less physically demanding than most pow-wow dances. Some of the Gourd Dances that are held go on all afternoon and on into the evening when it finally cools off enough so that more energetic Intertribal dances can begin. Some Tribal dances feature only Gourd Dancing.

== Regalia ==
Modern Gourd Dance regalia consists of a red and blue blanket draped over the shoulders. (This accessory represents night and day). Some dancers change the blanket to rest over the heart red during the day and blue after dark. A skunk berry (d̶áiñb̶èè:gàu) and silver-beaded bandolier fastened on the left shoulder is draped across the heart. The red skunk berry bandolier was added as a memorial tribute to a battle fought with Cheyenne warriors. The aftermath left the land covered with red blood and is represented by the red skunk berries. A handkerchief bundle of Indian perfume (á:séñóñ:gàut), gathered from the foothills, is tied to the back of the bandolier.

A metal rattle to accompany the drumbeat and a feathered fan usually are held in opposite hands. Normally Kiowa Gourd Clan members do not use real gourds in this dance because they are associated with the Native American Church ceremonies.

Traditionally dressed gourd dancers wear buckskin leggings and a long, red breechcloth. These are covered by a black fringed shawl wrapped above the black shawl to secure it. Today these are accompanied with a long sleeved shirt, bolo tie or tie.

Head attire can include hair wrapped with otter wraps, a roach or otter cap. Following Kiowa protocol, it is considered disrespectful to wear ball caps, T-shirts, cowboy hats or boots while participating in this dance. The four Kiowa headsman of this society urge its members to dress with dignity and discretion.

== Music and choreography ==
Like pow-wow dancing, Gourd Dancing is performed in a circular arena. The drum can be placed on the side or in the center of the arena. The dancers take their place around the perimeter of the area. During most of the song, the dancers dance in place, lifting their feet in time to the drumbeats, and shaking their rattles from side to side. At certain points in the singing, the drum beat changes to harder beats. At this point, the dancers will dance in place. When it changes to softer beats the dancers will dance a short distance from their spots.

Typically, the dance begins in the afternoon, and the opening song (referred to as a "Calling Song") is sung first. The head singer will determine how many songs are sung in a set. Usually the slower paced songs are sung in the beginning and progressively faster songs are sung as the gourd dance progresses. When the gourd dance draws to a close, a fast song is usually the last to be performed, but it is not the "official" closing song. Sometimes buffalo songs will be sung after that last gourd dance song.
