= Native American Music Awards =

Native American Music Awards NAMAs "Nammys"
- Awarded for: Outstanding achievements in the Native American music industry
- Country: United States
- Presented by: Elbel Productions, Inc. The Native American Music Awards Inc. The Native American Music Association
- First award: 1998
- Website: https://nativeamericanmusicawards.com/

The Native American Music Awards (also known as the NAMAs or "Nammys") are an awards program presented annually by Elbel Productions, Inc., The Native American Music Awards Inc., and The Native American Music Association, a 501(c)(3) non-profit organization incorporated in 1998, which recognizes outstanding musical achievement in styles associated with Native Americans, predominantly in the United States and Canada.

While Native American performers in a variety of genres are also recognized, nominees do not have to be Native American themselves. The organization was founded by music industry executive Ellen Bello in 1998, with the aim of offering Native American musicians greater recognition from the American music industry and to create opportunities for international exposure and recognition. They state that their Annual Native American Music Awards is the largest membership-based organization for Native American music initiatives and consists of over 20,000 registered voting members and professionals in the field. They report holding the largest Native American music library in the world with a national archive featuring a collection of over 10,000 audio and video recordings in all formats housed since 1990.

== Awards show ==
The awards show honors national recordings released in the previous calendar year that encompass traditional and contemporary Native American music instrumentation and/or lyrics. Traditional music through history has been an integral part of Native American life and tribal identity, for example: pow wow music, round dance songs, and Native American flute music. Contemporary Native American music has grown to encompass many popular genres (for example: rock, pop, blues, hip hop, and country), as well as uniquely distinctive genres including Waila (or Chicken scratch) and Native American Church music. There is also a "Native Heart category", an award given specifically to non-native artists in the field.

Nominees are submitted and selected by a national advisory membership, consisting of professionals who pay an annual membership to join the organization. Winners are selected by a combined vote by the national membership and the general public, who can listen to and vote on nominees' songs featured on the Native American Music Awards website.

The awards ceremony features live artist performances and 30 awards categories in various traditional and contemporary music genres, as well as Lifetime Achievement Awards and Hall of Fame inductions. The program often reaches beyond talent from Indian reservations and embraces internationally renowned artists such as; Robbie Robertson, Rita Coolidge, John Densmore, Nelly Furtado, Rickey Medlocke, Felipe Rose, and others.

Other mainstream celebrities who have supported the Native American Music Awards include: Nile Rodgers, Richie Havens, Wayne Newton, Jennifer Warnes, Bruce Cockburn, Crystal Gayle, Kitty Wells, Mickey Hart of the Grateful Dead, Janice Marie Johnson of A Taste of Honey, KC of KC and the Sunshine Band, Little Steven Van Zandt, Nokie Edwards, and more.

== Awards ==
The dedicated Native American Music Awards successfully proposed the Grammy Award for Best Native American Music Album in 2000. The Native American Music Awards or N.A.M.A. was the first national awards program for Native American music in North America. The Awards was born out of a need for greater recognition for Native American music initiatives and remains the largest professional membership based organization in the world.

From 2001 to 2011, the American Grammy Awards presented an annual award for Best Native American Music Album, and the Canadian Juno Awards present an annual award for Aboriginal Recording of the Year. On April 6, 2011, it was announced that the Grammy Award for Best Native American Music Album would be merged into a new category, Best Regional Roots Music Album.

The awards ceremonies have typically been hosted by Foxwoods Resort Casino, Hard Rock Hotel & Casino, Sandia Casino, Milwaukee Amphitheatre, Isletta Casino and Seneca Nation of New York's casino and in 2014 at the Seneca Allegany Casino.

== Lifetime Achievement Awards and Hall of Fame inductions ==
Another feature of the Native American Music Awards is the Lifetime Achievement Awards and Hall of Fame inductions:

=== Native American Music Awards Hall of Fame ===
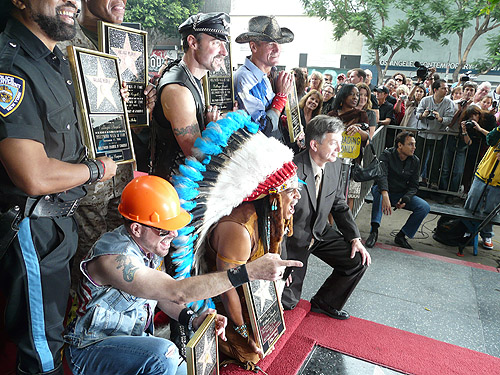
Felipe Rose, wearing a feathered headdress was inducted into the Native American Music Awards Hall of Fame in 2008

- Jimi Hendrix (self-identified Cherokee descent), 1998
- Buddy Red Bow (Oglala Lakota),1998
- Hank Williams, 1999
- Jim Pepper (Kaw/Muscogee Creek), 2000
- Crystal Gayle (self-identified Cherokee descent), 2001
- Kitty Wells, 2002
- Doc Tate Nevaquaya (Comanche Nation), 2006
- Link Wray (self-identified Shawnee descent), 2007
- Redbone (Yaqui/Shoshone descent), 2008
- Rickey Medlocke of Lynyrd Skynyrd/Blackfoot, 2008
- Janice-Marie Johnson (Stockbridge-Munsee descent) of A Taste of Honey, 2008
- Felipe Rose of Village People (Lakota descent), 2008
- Ritchie Valens (Yaqui), 2009
- Nokie Edwards (Cherokee), 2011
- Keith Secola (Ojibwe), 2011
- Russell Means (Oglala Lakota), 2013
- Taboo (Shoshone), 2016
- Mickie James (self-identified Powhatan descent), 2017
- Jesse Ed Davis (Kiowa/Comanche), 2018
- Wes Studi (Cherokee Nation), 2019

=== Lifetime Achievement Awards ===
- Robbie Robertson (Mohawk), 1998
- Rita Coolidge (self-identified Cherokee descent), 1999
- Tom Bee of XIT (Dakota descent), 2000
- R. Carlos Nakai (Navajo/Ute), 2001
- John Densmore, 2003
- Tiger Tiger (Miccosukee), 2007
- Joanne Shenandoah (Oneida), 2008
- Bill Miller (Stockbridge-Munsee), 2008
- Stevie Salas (Apache descent), 2009
- John Trudell (Santee Dakota), Living Legend, 1998
- Navajo Code talkers (Navajo), Living Legend, 1999
- The Neville Brothers, Living Legend, 2001
- Floyd Red Crow Westerman (Santee Dakota), Living Legend, 2002
- Tommy Allsup (Cherokee), Living Legend, 2009
- Saginaw Grant, (Sac And Fox)Living Legend, 2016

== See also ==
- Grammy Award for Best Native American Music Album
- List of Native American musicians
- Native American music
