= List of oboists =

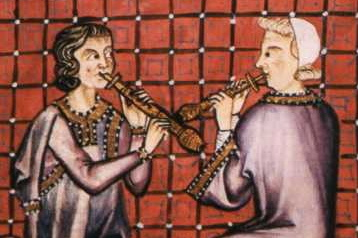
Two musette players from the Cantigas de Santa Maria, 13th century

An oboist (formerly hautboist) is a musician who plays the oboe or any oboe family instrument, including the oboe d'amore, cor anglais or English horn, bass oboe and piccolo oboe or oboe musette.

The following is a list of notable past and present professional oboists, with indications when they were/are known better for other professions in their own time. Oboists with an asterisk (*) have biographies in the online version of the Grove Dictionary of Music and Musicians.

== Historical oboists ==
=== Baroque period 1600–1760 ===
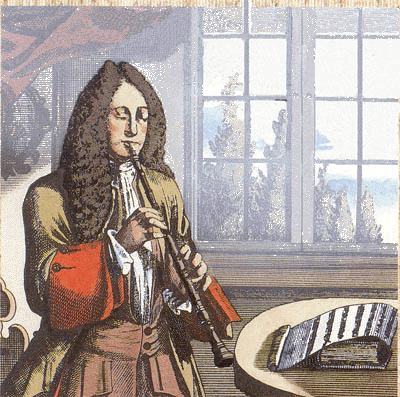
Oboist – etching and print by Johann Christoph Weigel (1661–1726)

- Francesco Barsanti (1690–1772), Italian * (composer)
- Alessandro Besozzi (1702–1773), Italian
- Antonio Besozzi (1714–1781), Italian
- Cristoforo Besozzi (1661–1725), Italian
- Giuseppe Besozzi (1686–1760), Italian
- Paolo Girolamo Besozzi (1713–1778), Italian
- Mateo Bissoli (Bisioli) (c. 1711 – 1780), Italian
- Esprit Philippe Chédeville (1696–1762), French *
- Nicolas Chédeville (1705–1782), French *
- Pierre Chédeville (1694–1725), French *
- André Danican Philidor (c. 1652–1730), French * (music librarian)
- Anne Danican Philidor (1681–1728), French
- Jean Danican Philidor (c. 1620 – 1679), French
- Michel Danican Philidor (1580–1651), French
- Pierre Danican Philidor (1681–1731), French
- John Ernest Galliard (c. 1675 – 1747), German *
- Johann Caspar Gleditsch (1684–1747), German ("Bach's oboist")
- Peter Glösch (c. 1685 – 1754), German
- Jean Hotteterre (c. 1610 – 1691), French * (instrument maker) (one of several oboists in the family)
- Martin Hotteterre (1635–1712), French * (instrument maker)
- Nicolas Hotteterre (1637–1694), French *
- Johann Christian Jacobi (1719–1784), German (oboist at Janitsch's "Freitags-Akademien")
- Jean Christian Kytch (died c. 1738), Dutch ("Handel's oboist")
- François La Riche (1662 – after 1733), Flemish *
- Jacques Loeillet (1685–1748), Flemish *
- Jean-Baptiste Loeillet (1680–1730), Flemish *
- Jacques Paisible (c. 1656 – 1721), French (oboist in Robert Cambert orchestra which moved to London in 1673)
- Joan Baptista Pla (c. 1720 – 1773), Spanish *
- Josep Pla (1728–1762), Spanish *
- Manuel Pla (c. 1725 – 1766), Spanish *
- Giovanni Benedetto Platti (1697–1763), Italian *
- Johann Christian Richter (1689–1744), German
- Jacob Riehman (c. 1680 – 1729), Dutch *
- Giuseppe Sammartini (1695–1750), Italian * (son of French oboist Alexis Saint-Martin)
- Georg Philipp Telemann (1681–1767), German composer (Oboe was one of over 10 instruments he played)
- Roberto Valentine (1674 – c. 1740), English * (composer)

=== Classical period 1730–1820 ===
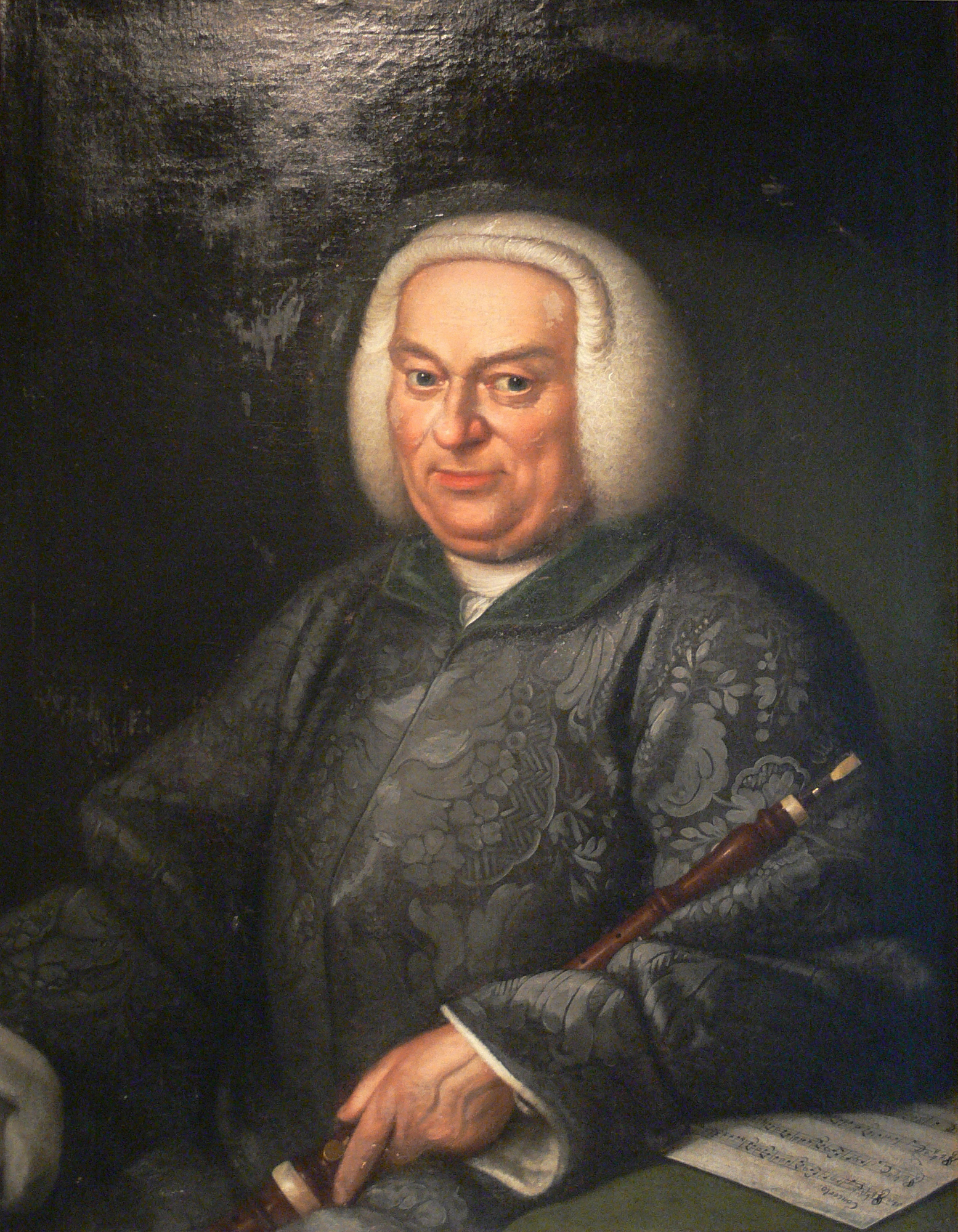
Portrait of an unknown oboist by anonymous painter, 1st half 18th century

- Sante Aguilar (c. 1734 – 1808), Italian
- Christian Frederik Barth (1787–1861), Danish
- Christian Samuel Barth (1735–1809), German *
- Frederik Philip Carl August Barth (1774–1804), Danish *
- Georg Benda (1722–1795), Czech * (composer)
- Carlo Besozzi (1738–1791), Italian
- Francesco Besozzi (1766–1816), Italian
- Gaetano Besozzi (1725–1794), Italian
- Girolamo Besozzi (c. 1745 – 1788), Italian
- Friedrich Braun (1759–1824), German *
- Franz Joseph Czerwenka (1759–1835), Czech-Austrian ("Beethoven's oboist")
- Georg Druschetzky (1745–1819), Czech *
- Giuseppe Ferlendis (1755–1810), Italian *
- Josef Fiala (1748–1816), Czech * ("Mozart's oboist 1")
- Johann Christian Fischer (1733–1800), German *
- Joseph François Garnier (1755–1825), French *
- Michel Joseph Gebauer (1763–1812), French *
- Gottlieb Graupner (1767–1836), German-American
- William Herschel (1738–1822), German (astronomer) (before 1765 primarily oboist, only later an astronomer)
- François Jadin (1731–1790), French *
- Carl Khym (1770–after 1819), Czech *
- Ludwig August Lebrun (1746–1790), German *
- Ignace Malzat (1757–1804), Austrian (probably wrote the "Haydn" oboe concerto) *
- Domenico Mancinelli (c. 1723 – 1804), Italian *
- Carl Ludwig Matthes (1751–?), German
- John Parke (1745–1829), English *
- William Thomas Parke (1762–1847), English *
- Giuseppe Prota (1737–1807), Italian *
- Friedrich Ramm (1744–1813), German ("Mozart's oboist 2")
- François Alexandre Antoine Sallantin (1755 – c. 1830), French *
- Johann Friedrich Schröter (1724–1811), German *
- Charles J. Suck (c. 1760 – c. 1808), English *
- Philipp Teimer (Filip Matyas Tajmar) (1767–1817), Bohemian (English horn)
- Georg Triebensee (1746–1813), Bohemian *
- Josef Triebensee (1772–1846), Bohemian * (composer)
- Jan Nepomuk Vent (1745–1801), Bohemian *
- Thomas Vincent (1720–1783), English *

=== Romantic period 1815–1910 ===
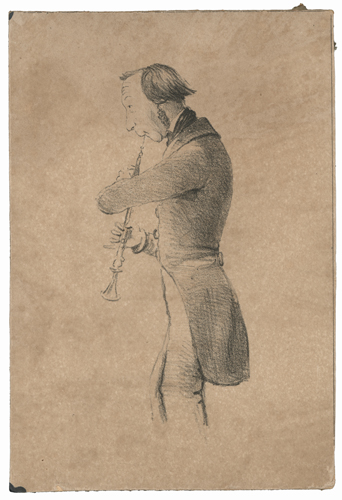
Johann Friedrich Diethe (1810–1891), oboist of the Gewandhausorchester by C. Reimers

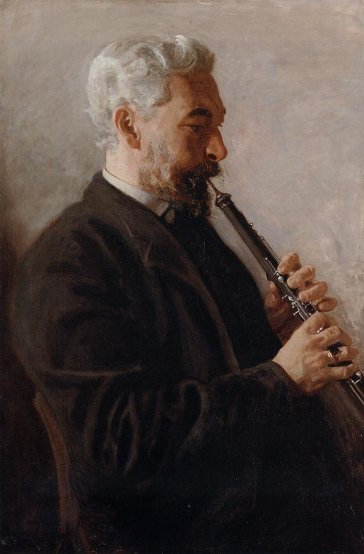
The Oboe Player (Benjamin Sharp) by Thomas Eakins, 1903

- Apollon Barret (1804–1879), French *
- Christian Frederik Barth (1787–1861), Danish *
- Richard Baumgärtel (1858–1941), German
- Félix-Charles Berthélemy (1829–1868), French
- Carl A.P. Braun (1788–1835), German *
- Wilhelm Braun (1796–1867), German *
- Henri Brod (1799–1839), French *
- Baldassare Centroni (c. 1784 – 1860), Italian ("Rossini's oboist")
- Charles Colin (1832–1881), French
- Franz Wilhelm Ferling (1796–1874), German
- Willi Gerlach (1909–1971), German
- Georges Gillet (1854–1920), French *
- Joseph Gungl (1810–1889), Hungarian * (conductor)
- Johann Peter Heuschkel (1773–1853), German *
- Ernst Krähmer (1795–1857), German *
- Olivo Krause (1857–1927), Danish
- Desiré Alfred Lalande (1866–1904), French *
- Antoine Joseph Lavigne (1816–1886), French
- Johann Heinrich Luft (1813–1877), German
- William Malsch (1855–1924), English *
- Giovanni Paggi (1806–1887), Italian *
- Antonio Pasculli (1842–1924), Italian * (the "Paganini of the oboe")
- Charles Reynolds (1843–1916), English
- Friedrich Ruthardt (1800–1862), German
- Adolf Rzepko (1825–1892), Polish *
- Joseph Sellner (1787–1843), Austrian
- Pedro Soler (1810–1850), Spanish
- Friedrich-Eugen Thurner (1785–1827), German
- Charles Triébert (1810–1867), French *
- Frédéric Triébert (1813–1878), French * (instrument maker)
- Raoul Triébert (1845 – c. 1894), French *
- Stanislas Verroust (1814–1863), French
- Gustave Vogt (1781–1870), French *
- Friedrich Westenholz (1778–1840), German *
- Carlo Yvon (1798–1854), Italian

== 20th-century oboists ==
Ralph Gomberg

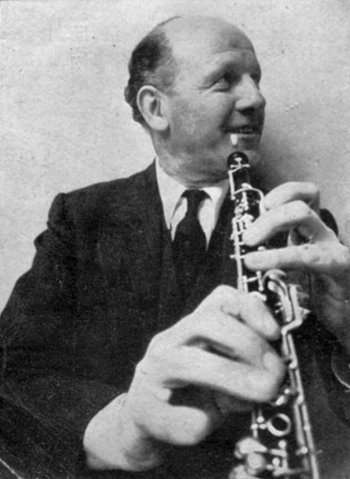
Leon Goosens

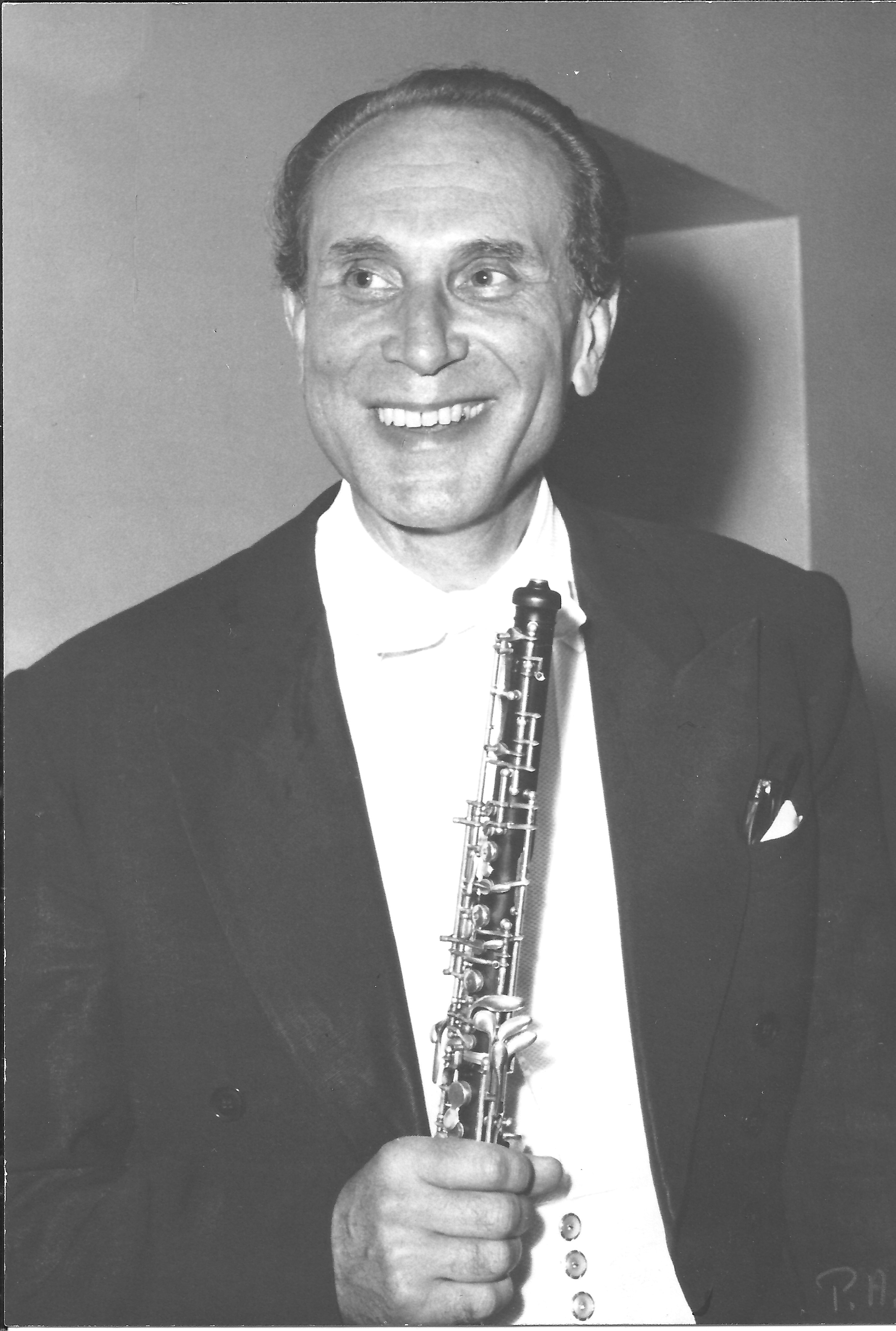
Haakon Stotijn, 1961

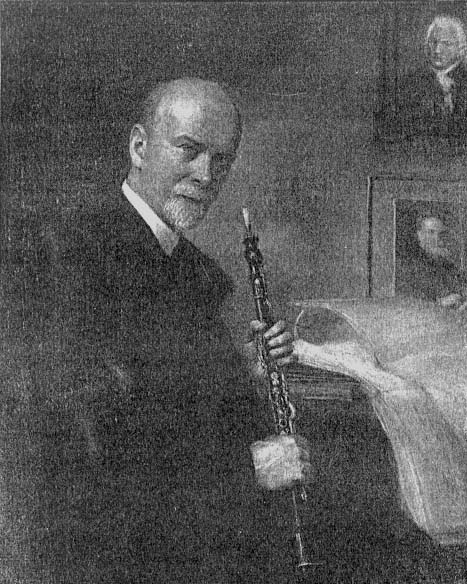
Alexander Wunderer

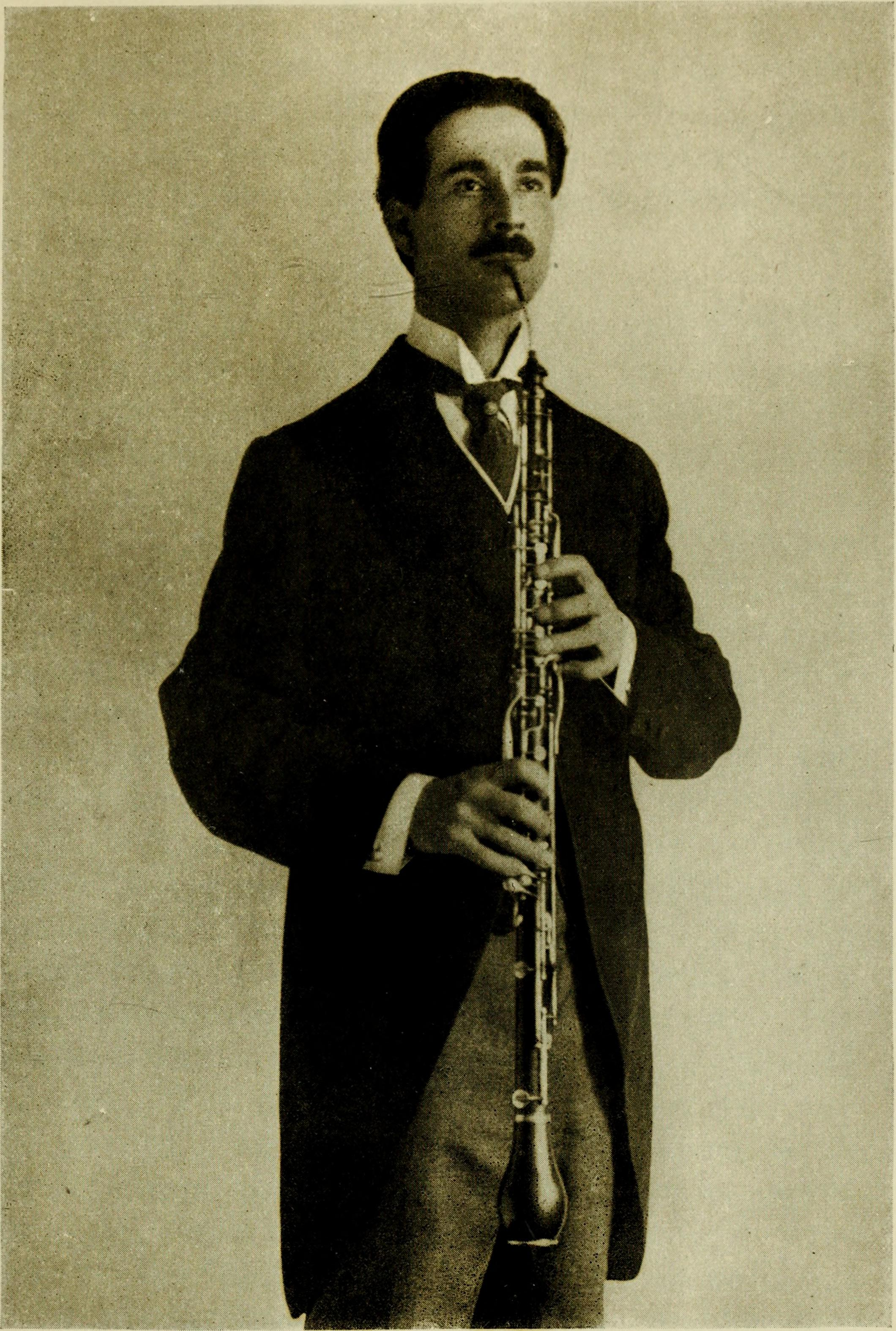
Attilio Bianco, English horn, 1917

=== A–L ===
- Albert J. Andraud (1884–1975), French-American
- Rhadames Angelucci (1915–1991), American
- Alfred Barthel (1871–1957), French
- Evelyn Barbirolli (born Evelyn Rothwell), (1911–2008), English *
- Louis Bas (1863–1944), French
- Etienne Baudo (1903–2001), French
- Louis Bleuzet (1871–1941), French
- Robert Bloom (1908–1994), American *
- Joy Boughton (1913–1963), English
- Maurice Bourgue (1939–2023), French
- Leonard Brain (1915–1975), English *
- Henri de Busscher (1880–1975), Belgian *
- Natalie Caine (1909–2008), English
- Jacques Chambon (1932–1984), French
- Janet Craxton (1929–1981), English * (Sister of the painter John Craxton)
- William Criss (1921–1984), American
- John de Lancie (1921–2002), American *
- Albert Debondue (1895–1984), French
- Antonio Estévez (1916–1988), Venezuelan * (composer)
- Alvin Etler (1913–1973), American * (composer)
- Svend Christian Felumb (1898–1972), Danish
- Peter Fischer (1924–2004), German
- Fritz Flemming (born 1872 or 1873; died 1947), German
- Réal Gagnier (1905–1984), Canadian
- Bert Gassman (1911–2004), American
- Fernand Gillet (1882–1980), French
- Ruth Gipps (1921–1999), British (composer)
- Albert Goltzer (1918–2007), American
- Harold Gomberg (1916–1985), American *
- Ralph Gomberg (1921–2006), American *
- Leon Goossens (1897–1988), English *
- Peter Graeme (1921–2012), English
- Percy Grainger (1882–1961), Australian-American
- František Hanták (1910–1990), Czech *
- Earnest Harrison (1918–2005), American
- Hans Kamesch (1901–1975), Austrian
- Rudolf Kempe (1910–1976), German * (conductor)
- Bruno Labate (1883–1968), Italian
- Roland Lamorlette (1894–1960), French
- Alfred Läubin (1906–1976), American (instrument maker)
- Marc Lifschey (1926–2000), American
- Georges Longy (1868–1930), French *

=== M–Z ===
- Terence MacDonagh (1908–1986), British
- Arno Mariotti (1911–1993), German-born American
- Josef Marx (1913–1978), German-American *
- Robert Mayer (1910–1994), American
- Karl Mayrhofer (1927–1976), Austrian
- Mitch Miller (1911–2010), American (choir conductor, recording director)
- Myrtile Morel (1889–1979), French
- Florian Mueller (1904–1983), American
- Pierre Pierlot (1921–2007), French
- Giuseppe Prestini (1877–1930), Italian
- David Reichenberg (1950–1987), American * (also listed under period instrumentalists below)
- A. Clyde Roller (1914–2005), American
- Marcel Saillet (1898–1983), Swiss
- Jürg Schaeftlein (1929–1986), Austrian *
- Riccardo Scozzi (1878–1955), Italian
- Edgar Shann (1919–1984), Swiss
- Harry Shulman (1916–1971), American
- Jerry Sirucek (1922–1996), American
- Koen van Slogteren (1922–1995), Dutch
- Václav Smetáček (1906–1986), Czech * (conductor)
- Robert Sprenkle (1914–1988), American
- Warren Stannard (1923–1995), American
- William Grant Still (1895–1978), American * (composer)
- Haakon Stotijn (1915–1964), Dutch *
- Jaap Stotijn (1891–1970), Dutch *
- František Suchý (1902–1977), Czech *
- Sidney Sutcliffe (1918–2001), Scottish
- Seizo Suzuki (1922–2008), Japanese
- Marcel Tabuteau (1887–1966), French/American *
- Jiří Tancibudek (1921–2004), Czech-Australian
- Giuseppe Tomassini (1915–1987), Italian
- Lois Wann (1912–1999), American
- Alexander Wunderer (1877–1955), Austrian

=== 20th-century players of the English horn ===
- Engelbert Brenner (1904–1986), Austrian- born American
- Harry Freedman (1922–2005), Polish-born Canadian (composer)
- Hans Hadamowsky (1906–1986), Austrian
- Peter Henkelman (1882–1949), Dutch
- Leo van der Lek (1908–1999), Dutch
- John Minsker (1912–2007), American
- Louis Speyer (1890–1980), French-born American

== Contemporary classical oboists ==
=== A–B ===
- Theodore Baskin (born 1950), American
- Perry Bauman (1918–2004), American-Canadian
- William Bennett (1956–2013), American
- Melvin Berman (1929–2008), American-Canadian
- León Biriotti (1929–2020), Uruguayan *
- Neil Black (1932–2016), English
- Douglas Boyd (born 1960), Scottish
- Peter Bree (born 1949), Dutch

=== C–E ===
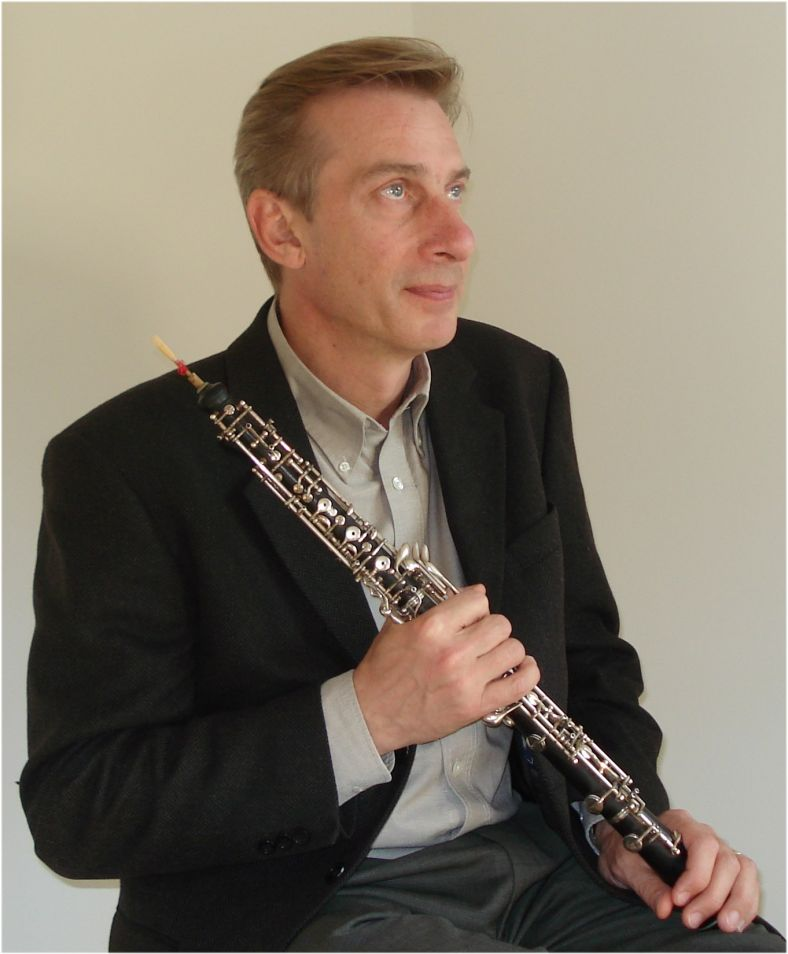
Niels Eje, 2009

- German Cáceres (born 1954), Salvadoran * (composer)
- Anthony Camden (1938–2006), English
- Roy Carter (born 1949), English
- Joseph Celli (born 1944), American *
- Nicholas Daniel (born 1962), English
- Clara Dent (born 1973), German (daughter of Simon Dent)
- Nick Deutsch (born 1972), Australian
- Paolo Di Cioccio (born 1963), Italian
- Diana Doherty (born 1966), Australian
- Elaine Douvas (born 1952), American
- Stuart Edward Dunkel, American
- Niels Eje (born 1954), Danish
- Majid Entezami (born 1947), Iranian

=== F–H ===
- John Ferrillo, American
- Sarah Francis (born 1938), English *
- Thomas Gallant, American
- Alfred Genovese (1931–2011), American
- Ariana Ghez (born 1979), American
- Burkhard Glaetzner (born 1943), German
- Wynne Godley (1926–2010), English (economist)
- Ingo Goritzki (born 1939), German
- Margaret Griebling-Haigh (born 1960), American
- Christoph Hartmann (born 1965), German
- Jared Hauser (born 1971), American
- Werner Herbers (1940–2023), Dutch
- Brynjar Hoff (born 1940), Norwegian
- Heinz Holliger (born 1939), Swiss *
- Gordon Hunt (born 1950), English

=== I–L ===
Eugene Izotov

- Thomas Indermühle (born 1951), Swiss
- Eugene Izotov (born 1973), Russian-American
- Helen Jahren (born 1959), Swedish
- Michael Kamen (1948–2003), American (film score composer)
- Melvin Kaplan (born 1929), American
- Jonathan Kelly (born 1969), British
- Alex Klein (born 1964), Brazilian
- Elizabeth Koch (born 1986), American
- Lothar Koch (1935–2003), German *
- Kalev Kuljus (born c. 1975), Estonian
- François Leleux (born 1971), French
- Lajos Lencsés (born 1943), Hungarian
- Jay Light (born 1940s), American
- Michael Lisicky (born 1964), American

=== M–Q ===
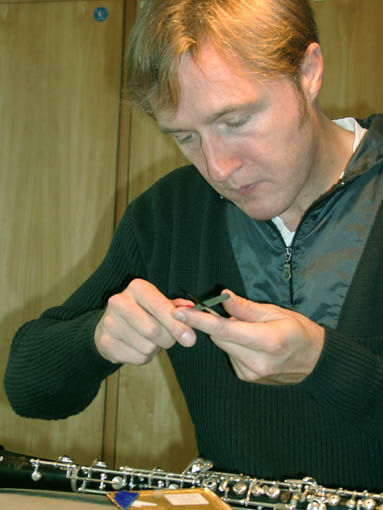
Albrecht Mayer making a reed

- John Mack (1927–2006), American
- Charles Mackerras (1925–2010), Australian (conductor) *
- Jean-Claude Malgoire (1940–2018), French
- Joel Marangella (born 1940s), American
- Eldevina Materula (born 1982), Mozambican
- Albrecht Mayer (born 1965), German
- Malcolm Messiter, English
- Fumiaki Miyamoto (born 1949) 宮本文昭, Japanese
- Lucas Macías Navarro (born 1978), Spanish
- Katherine Needleman (born 1978), American
- Alexei Ogrintchouk (born 1978), Russian
- Pauline Oostenrijk (born 1967), Dutch
- Ivan Podyomov, (born 1986), Russian
- Ivan Pushetchnikov (1918–2010), Russian

=== R–S ===
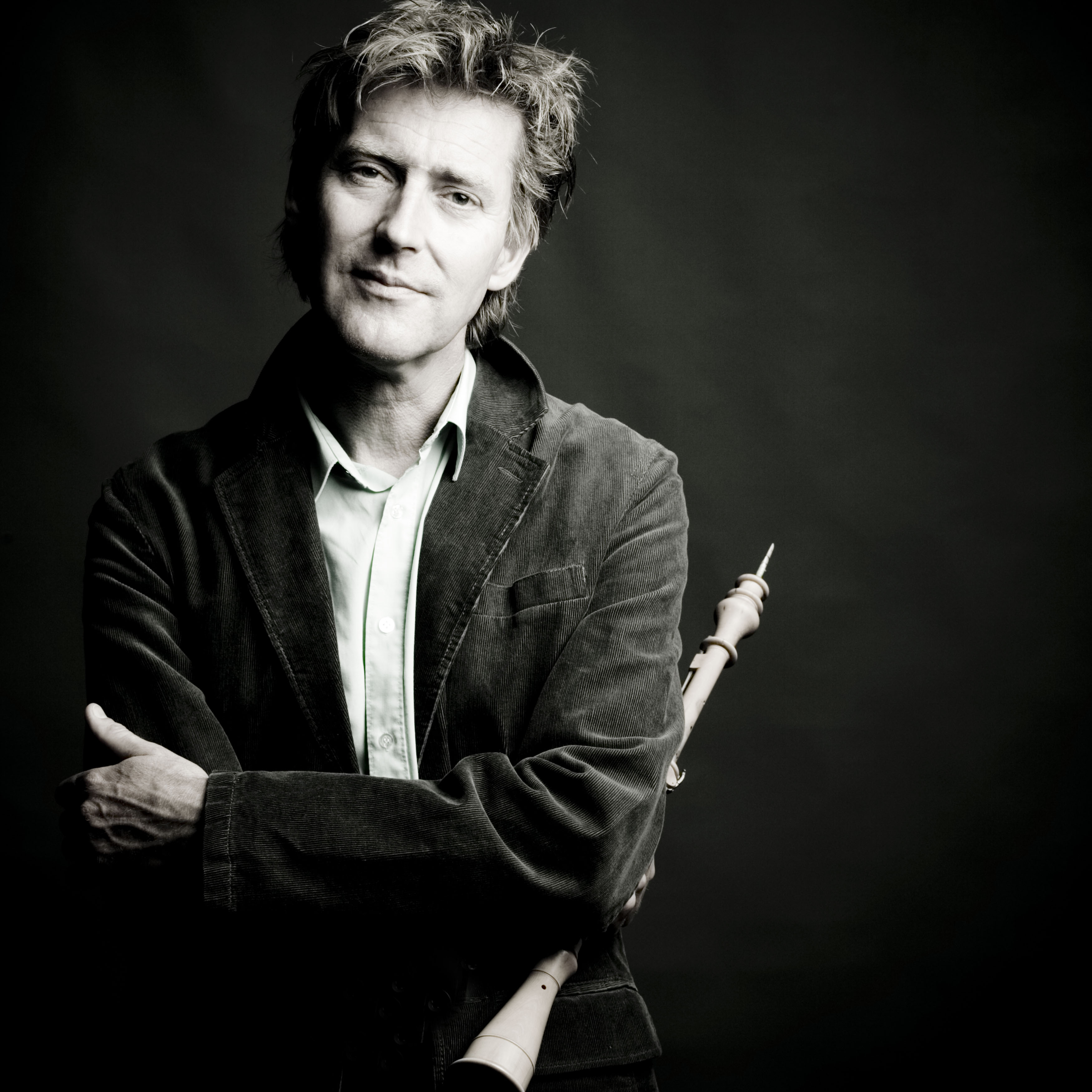
Bart Schneemann

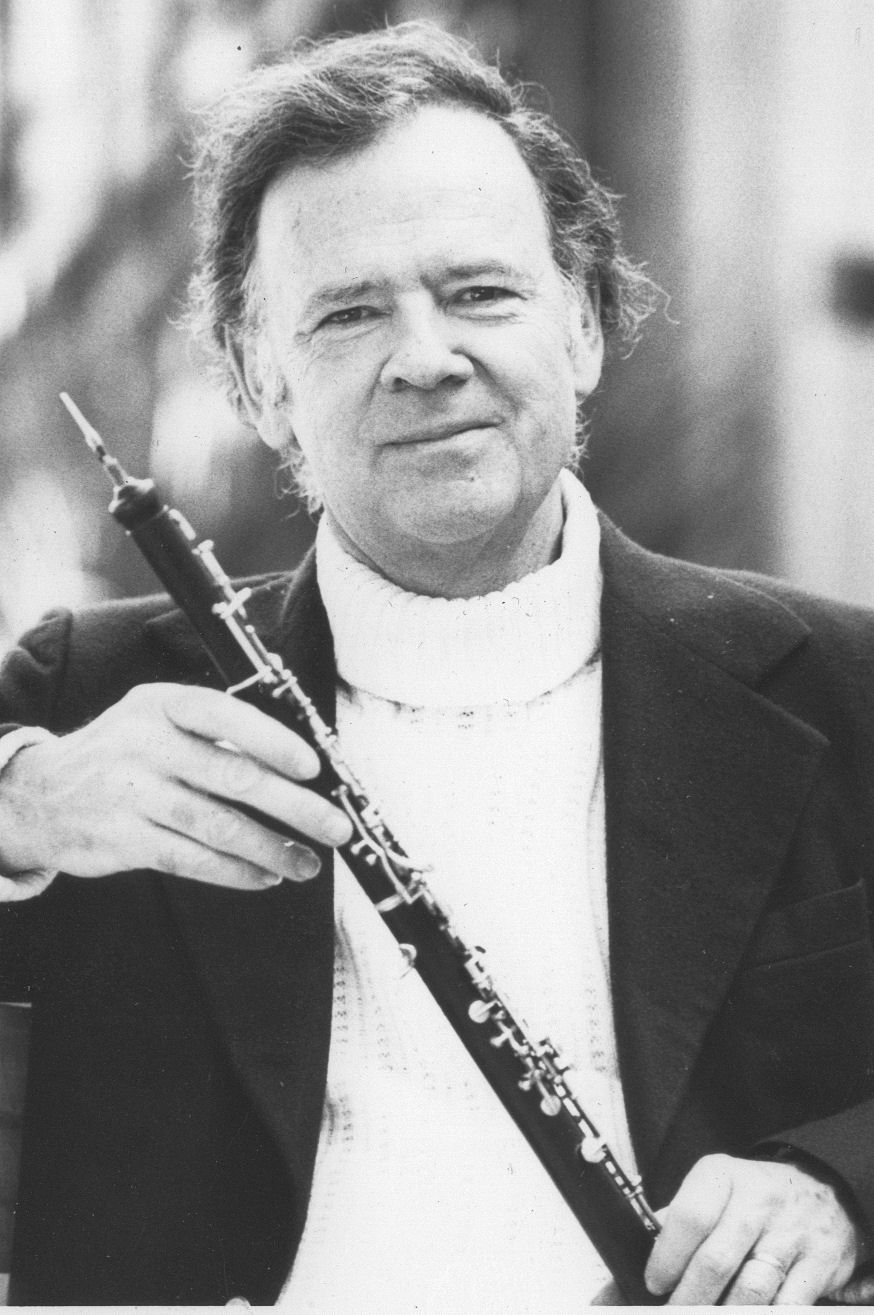
Ray Still, 1980s

- Elizabeth Raum (born 1945), Canadian *
- Juozas Rimas (born 1942), Lithuanian
- Joseph Robinson (born 1940), American *
- Pierre Rolland (1931–2011), Canadian
- Edwin Roxburgh (born 1937), English *
- Hansjorg Schellenberger (born 1948), German
- Bart Schneemann (born 1954), Dutch
- Stefan Schilli (born 1970), German
- Peter Smith, American
- Toyin Spellman-Diaz, American
- Ray Still (1920–2014), American
- Cynthia Steljes (1960–2006), Canadian
- Daniel Stolper (1935–2020), American
- Laila Storch (1921–2022), American

=== T–Z ===
- Blair Tindall (1960–2023), American (author)
- Piet Van Bockstal (born 1963), Belgian
- Allan Vogel (born 1944), American
- Han de Vries (born 1941), Dutch *
- Edo de Waart (born 1941), Dutch * (conductor)
- David Walter (born 1958), French
- Liang Wang (born 1980) 王亮, Chinese

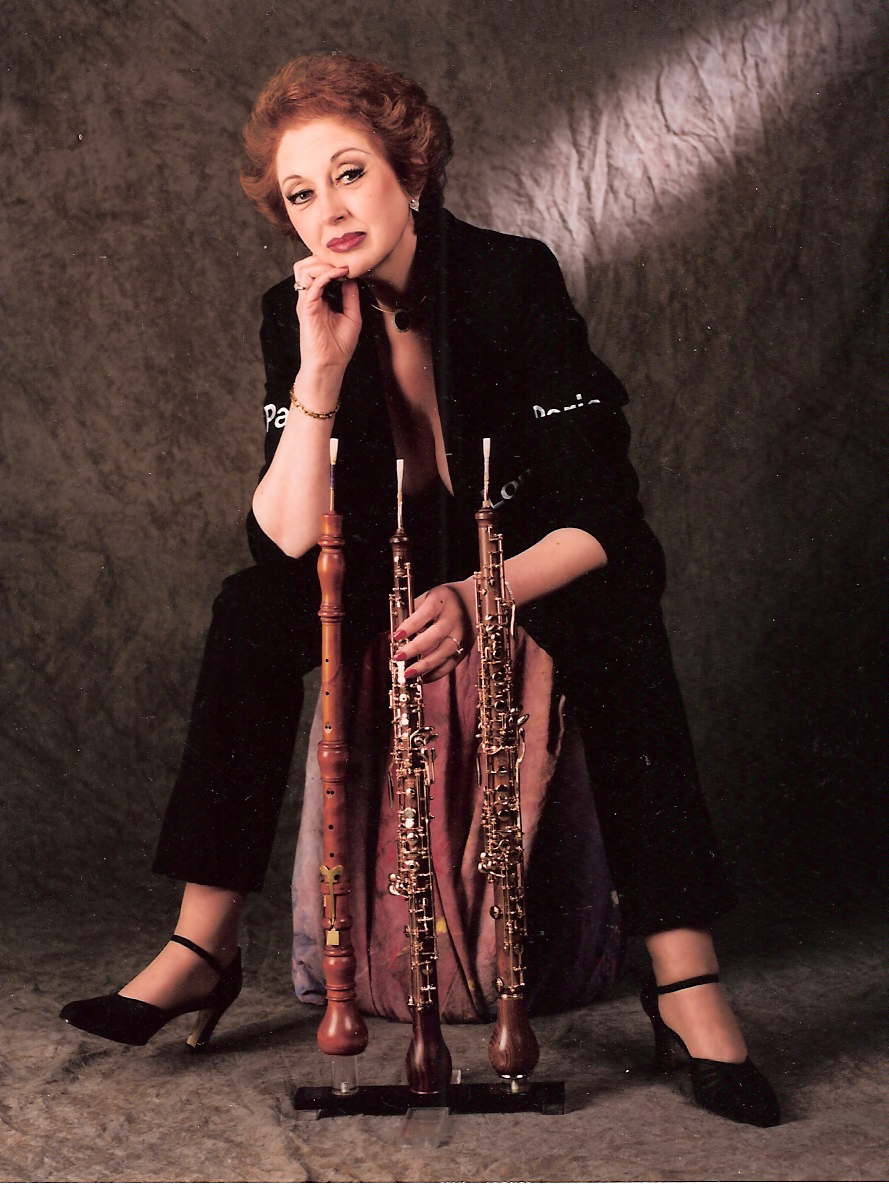
Jennifer Paull with three Oboe d'amores

- Judith Weir (born 1954), Scottish (composer) *
- Helmut Winschermann (1920–2021), German (conductor)
- Andreas Wittmann (born 1961), German
- Richard Woodhams (born 1949), American
- Omar Zoboli (born 1953), Italian

=== Contemporary oboists best known for playing English horn (cor anglais) or oboe d'amore ===
- Jennifer Paull (born 1944), English (oboe d'amore)

=== Contemporary oboists best known for playing period instruments ===
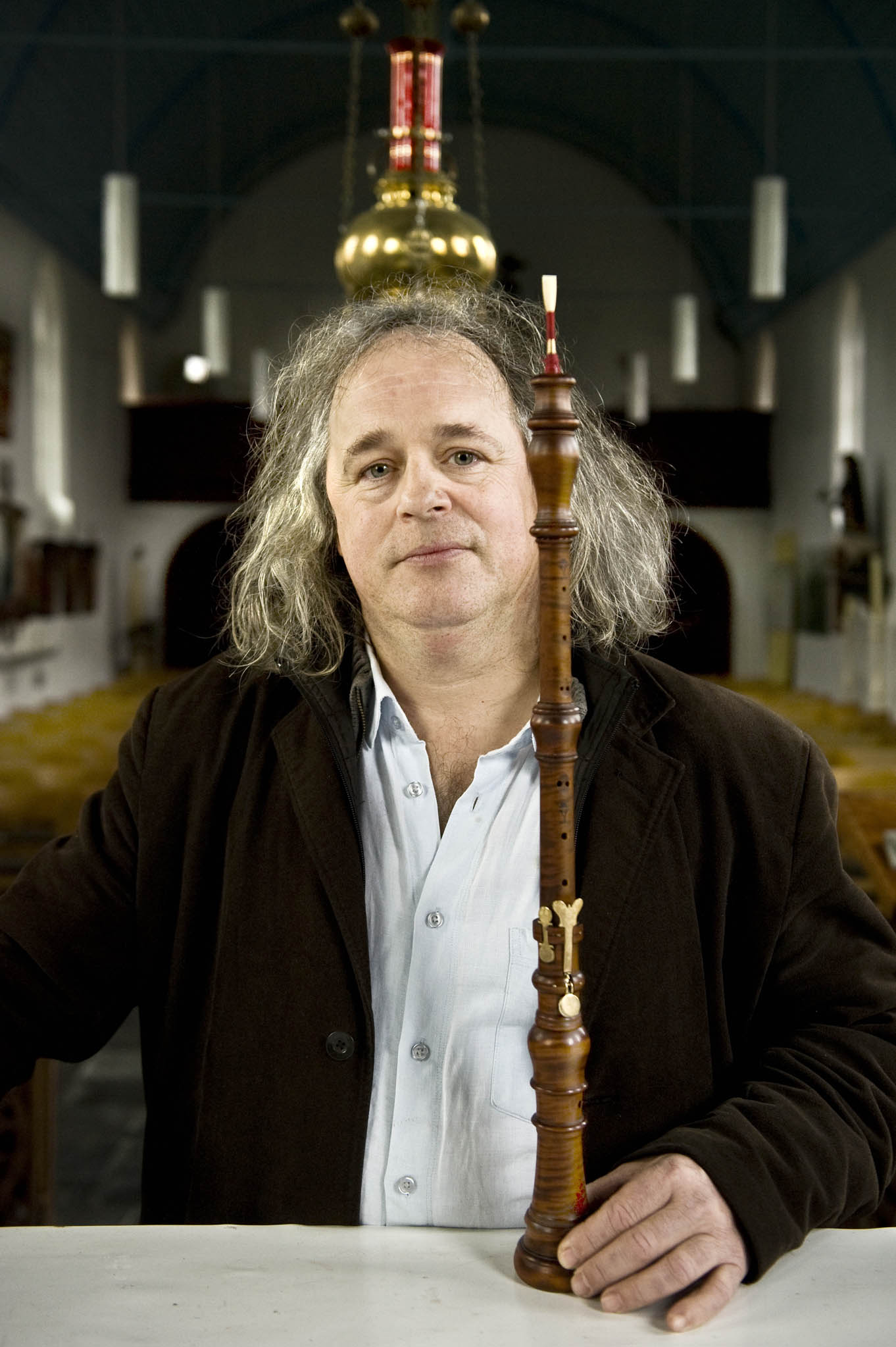
Marcel Ponseele

- Paul Dombrecht (born 1948), Belgian
- Paul Goodwin (born 1956), English *
- Bruce Haynes (1942–2011), American-Canadian *
- Takeharu Nobuhara (born 1943), Japanese (conductor)
- Christopher Palameta (born 1979), Canadian
- Marcel Ponseele (born 1957), Belgian
- Susanne Regel (born 1974), German
- David Reichenberg (1950–1987), American *
- Hugo Reyne (born 1961), French

== Oboists performing primarily outside classical genres ==
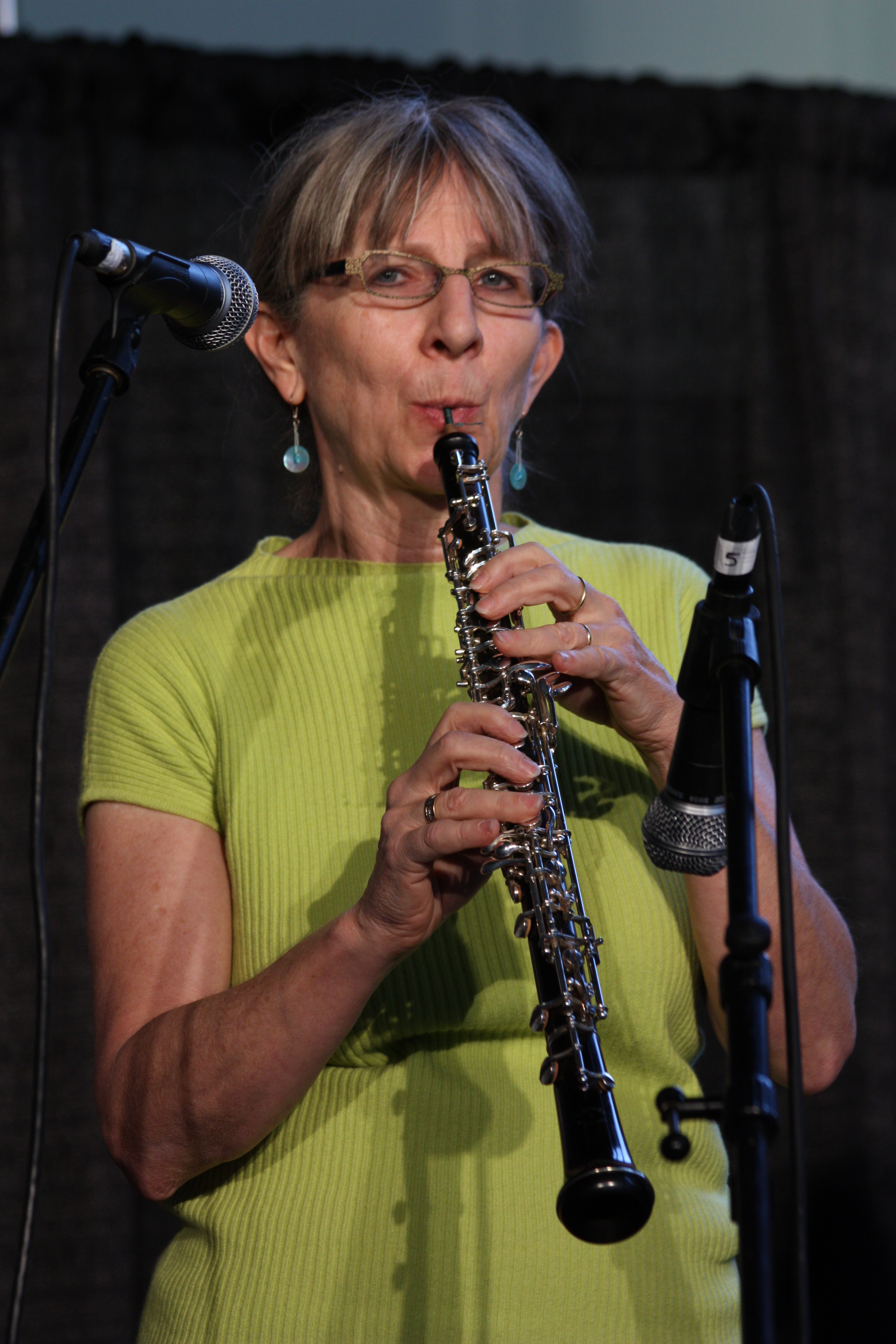
Nancy Rumbel

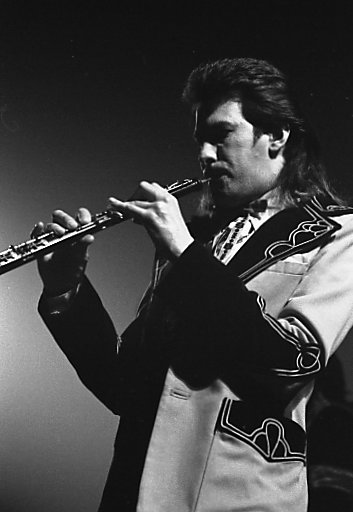
Andy Mackay of Roxy Music, 1974

=== As primary instrument ===
- Kyle Bruckmann (born 1971), American – free improvisation
- Lindsay Cooper (1951–2013), English – art rock
- Jean-Luc Fillon (born 1960s), French – jazz
- Karl Jenkins (born 1944), Welsh * – jazz
- Colin Maier (born 1976), Canadian – new classical, celtic
- Paul McCandless (born 1947), American * – jazz
- Nancy Rumbel (born 1951), American – new age
- Sonny Simmons (1933–2021), American – jazz
- Frank Socolow (1923–1981), American – jazz
- Kate St John (born 1957), English – art rock, pop
- Libby Van Cleve (born 1958), American – avant garde
- Russel Walder (born 1959), American – new age

=== As secondary instrument ===
- Ahmad Alaadeen (1934–2010), American – jazz (saxophonist)
- Marshall Allen (born 1924), American – jazz (saxophonist)
- Derek Bell (1935–2002), Irish – folk (harpist)
- Amanda Brown (born 1965), Australian – indie rock (violinist, guitarist)
- Garvin Bushell (1902–1991), American – jazz (all reeds)
- Bob Cooper (1925–1993), American – jazz (saxophone)
- Julie Fowlis (born 1979), Scottish – Celtic (vocalist)
- Vinny Golia (born 1946), American – jazz (all woodwinds)
- Joseph Jarman (1937–2019), American – jazz (clarinetist, saxophonist)
- Mick Karn (1958–2011), British – rock (multi-instrumentalist)
- Rahsaan Roland Kirk (1936–1977), American – jazz (multi-instrumentalist)
- Yusef Lateef (1920–2013), American – jazz (saxophonist, flutist)
- Giuseppi Logan (1935–2020), American – jazz (multi-instrumentalist)
- Andy Mackay (born 1946), English – art rock (saxophonist)
- Charlie Mariano (1923–2009), American – jazz (saxophonist)
- Makanda Ken McIntyre (1931–2001), American – jazz (saxophonist)
- Roscoe Mitchell (born 1940), American – jazz (saxophonist)
- Dewey Redman (1931–2006), American – jazz (saxophonist, suona)
- Don Redman (1900–1964), American – jazz (clarinetist, saxophonist)
- Sufjan Stevens (born 1975), American – indie rock (multi-instrumentalist)
- Kjartan Sveinsson (born 1978), Icelandic – post-rock (keyboardist)

== Shehnai players ==
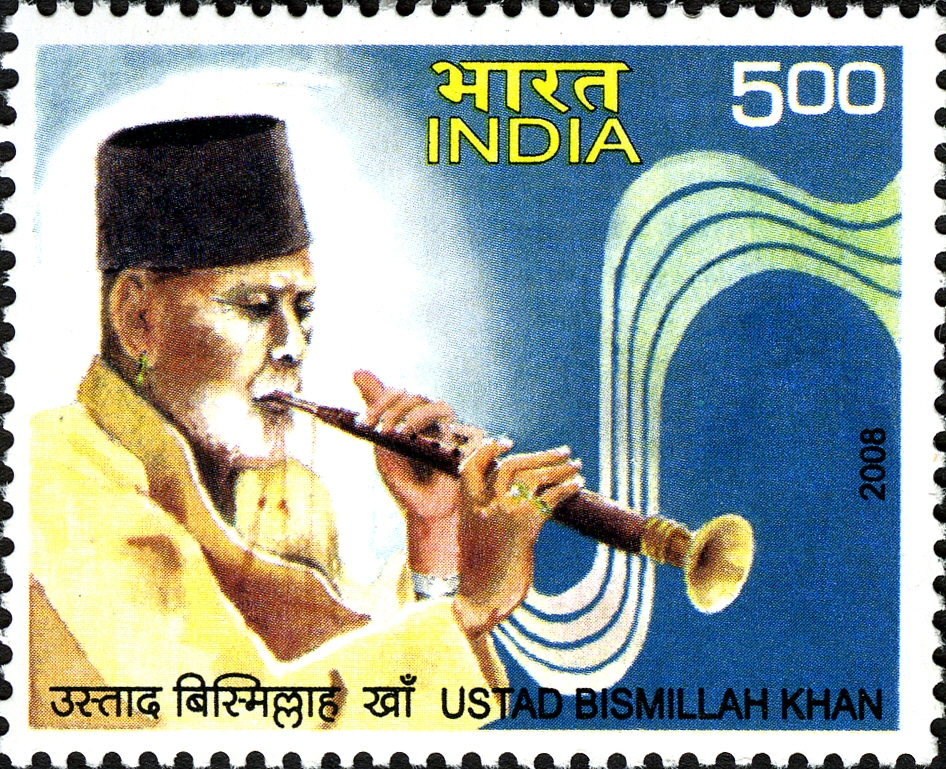
Bismillah Khan

- Ali Ahmed Hussain Khan (1939–2016), Indian
- Bismillah Khan (1916–2006), Indian
- S. Ballesh (born 1958), Indian
