= Stuart Dunkel =

American painter

Stuart Dunkel is an oboist and painter based in Massachusetts. He has performed in a number of orchestras listed below. He has been painting since age five and playing music since age 7. He has written a book The Audition Process: Anxiety Management and Coping Strategies and released a CD of his music called Oboe Colors. He owns two businesses: Oboe Cane and Reeds By Stuart Dunkel, and Fenway Grays. He has taught at Boston University, The Longy Music School, The New England Conservatory of Music, and the Boston Conservatory of Music.

== Music ==
He studied music at

- Boston University, for his Bachelors in 1975
- Mannes College of Music, for his Masters in 1985
- Juilliard School of Music, for his Doctorate in 1987
- Studied with
  - Robert Bloom
  - Elaine Douvas
  - Harold Gomberg
  - Ralph Gomberg
  - John Mack
  - Harry Shulman

Performed with

- Boston Symphony Orchestra, 1974–1981, 1987–1988
- Boston Pops Esplanade Orchestra, 1974–1981, 1987–1988
- Boston Ballet
- Detroit Symphony Orchestra
- Florida Gulf Coast Symphony
- Hong Kong Philharmonic Orchestra
- Huntington Theatre Company
- Metropolitan Opera Orchestra
- Mostly Mozart Festival Orchestra
- New Hampshire Symphony Orchestra
- New Jersey Symphony Orchestra
- New York Philharmonic Orchestra
- Opera Company of Boston
- Pro Arte Chamber Orchestra
- Rhode Island Symphony Orchestra
- Springfield Symphony Orchestra
- Westfield Symphony Orchestra

== Painting ==
He studied art at

- Boston Museum School
- Seattle Academy of Realist Art
- Studied with
  - Tom Ouellette
  - Denise Mickilowski
  - Dennis Cheaney
  - Andrew Kusmin
  - Karen Winslow
  - Joe McGurl
  - Donald Demers
  - Sergio Roffo
  - Robert Douglas Hunter
  - Gayle Levee
