= Perry Bauman =

Canadian-American oboist (1918–2004)

- Born: 22 July 1918; Erie, Pennsylvania, U.S.
- Died: 16 August 2004 (aged 86)
- Genres: Classical
- Occupation: Instrumentalist
- Instrument: Oboe
- Years active: 1940–1984

Perry Wayne Bauman (22 July 1918 – 16 August 2004) was an oboist, born and educated in the United States and active in Canada. He served as the principal oboe of the Toronto Symphony Orchestra, the CBC Symphony Orchestra, the orchestra of the National Ballet of Canada, and the Edmonton Symphony Orchestra. Bauman taught at the Royal Conservatory of Music in Toronto and the University of Western Ontario in London, Ontario.

== Early life ==
Perry Bauman was born in Erie, Pennsylvania. In 1920, the family moved to Dorset, Ohio, not far from Erie. Bauman began playing saxophone in school band, later switching to the oboe. He competed in band championships, and shortly before he turned 17 he won a national championship on the oboe. This title earned him a place at the Curtis Institute of Music, where he studied the oboe with Marcel Tabuteau from 1937 to 1942.

== Career ==
In 1940, Bauman moved to Toronto to become the principal oboe with the Toronto Symphony Orchestra (TSO). He continued with the TSO until 1956, then re-joined them again from 1964 to 1971 as co-principal, and occasionally in 1982–1984. He was also principal oboe with the CBC Symphony Orchestra for its entire existence from 1952 to 1964, and with the orchestra of the National Ballet of Canada from 1960 to 1966.

While in Toronto, Bauman taught at the Royal Conservatory of Music, where his pupils included Lawrence Cherney and Harry Freedman.

In 1956, Bauman founded the Toronto Woodwind Quintet with Gordon Day (flute), Ezra Schabas (clarinet), Eugene Rittich (horn), and Nicholas Kilburn (bassoon). Bauman performed with the quintet until 1971, when Melvin Berman took over the oboe chair.

From 1971 through 1979, Bauman was co-principal oboe, later principal oboe, of the Edmonton Symphony Orchestra. In 1979, he came back east to teach at the University of Western Ontario until 1984.

== Bibliography ==
- "Perry Bauman". The Canadian Encyclopedia. Historica Canada. 15 December 2013.
