= Christopher Palameta =

Canadian oboist

Christopher Palameta is an oboist specializing in historically informed performance. He is based in Paris.

Palameta was born in 1979 in Montreal, Quebec, and took his graduate degree from McGill University in historical oboes. His main teachers were Theodore Baskin, Washington McClain, and Bruce Haynes. He is currently pursuing his PhD at the Royal Academy of Music in London and teaches historical oboes at the Sibelius Academy (Helsinki University of Arts).

After being appointed second oboist in the Tafelmusik Baroque Orchestra (based in Toronto, Canada), of which he was a core member from 2003 to 2007, he relocated to France to pursue work with many of Europe's period ensembles including Pygmalion, Les Siècles, and La Grande Ecurie in France; Die Kölner Akademie in Germany; Vox Luminis and La Petite Bande in Belgium; The Gabrieli Consort in the UK; Il Pomo d'Oro in Italy; Capella Cracoviensis in Poland; and various other ensembles such as the Australian Brandenburg Orchestra, the Helsinki Baroque Orchestra, Suomalainen Barokkiorkesteri (the Finnish Baroque Orchestra), and MusicAeterna (Perm, Russia).

Palameta has participated in over 40 commercial recordings for the Sony BMG, Deutsche Harmonia Mundi, Audax Records, BIS, CPO, Analekta, ATMA Classique, and Naxos labels.

In 2003 and 2006, he was awarded research grants from the Conseil des arts et des lettres du Québec.

His chamber recordings have been reviewed positively. In 2009, 'Janitsch: Sonate de camera, Volume I' was nominated for a Prix Opus in the category 'Best CD of the Year' by the Conseil québécois de la musique., while his recording of suites for oboe by Marin Marais on the Audax Records label was nominated in 2015 for a Preis der Deutschen Schallplattenkritik (German Record Critics' Award).
