= Ariana Ghez =

American classical oboist

Ariana Ghez (born 1979) is an American classical oboist.

From 2006 to 2017, Ghez was the principal oboist of the Los Angeles Philharmonic. Prior to Los Angeles, she was principal oboist of the Rochester Philharmonic Orchestra and the Santa Fe Opera. She has also performed as guest principal oboe with the Chicago Symphony Orchestra, New York Philharmonic, and the St. Louis Symphony Orchestra.

Ghez pursued her undergraduate studies at Columbia University where she majored in English literature, and at the Juilliard School, where she studied with John Mack and John Ferrillo. She was enrolled in the joint program between the two schools. She was a graduate student at Temple University under Richard Woodhams.

In 2017, Ghez left the Los Angeles Philharmonic to pursue interests outside of the musical world. She and her family now reside in the Pacific Northwest.
