= Paul Ji =

American-Chinese pianist

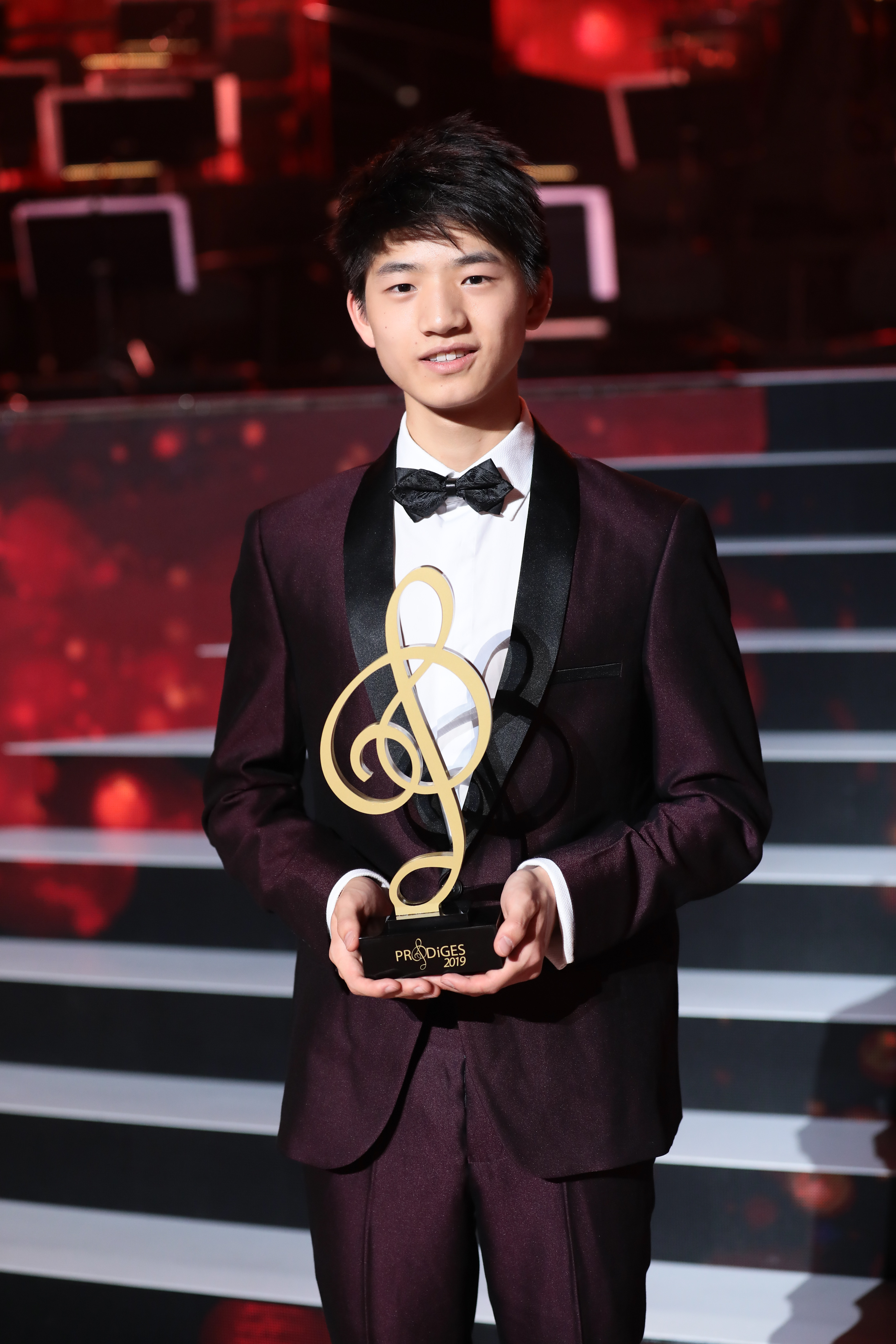
- Paul Ji wins Prodiges 2019
- Born: 2004 (age 21–22); Chicago, Illinois, U.S.
- Awards: Winner of the International Steinway Competition 7 times between 2010 and 2018; Berlin Rising Stars Grand Prix; Prodiges Saison 6 Distinction of Honorary Bellifontain
- Musical career
- Genres: Classical
- Label: Warner Classics
- Website: paulji.com

Paul Ji (born 2004) is an American pianist.

== Early life ==
Paul Ji was born in Chicago. His mother, Xiaowei Rose Luo, is a professor at INSEAD. Paul Ji started his musical journey when he was four years old. His elder sister Esther had a big impact on his interest in piano, as she also played the instrument.

At the age of 12, he was under the instruction of Elizabeth Cooper at the prestigious Schola Cantorum in Paris, then at École Normale de musique de Paris with teacher Jean-Bernard Pommier.

He lives in Fontainebleau, France.

Ji is a Steinway artist.

== Education ==
Ji currently attends Yale University. He was a Music Scholar at Eton College.

== Competitions and awards ==
=== Concerts ===
He has performed solo recitals in prestigious venues such as the “Golden Hall” in Vienna’s Musikverein, the Berlin Philharmonie, and the Théâtre des Champs-Élysées in Paris where he dedicated his debut recital to works of Chopin including the full cycle of 24 Preludes.

After winning the Concerto Competition in Lucca, Italy, he performed Chopin’s 2nd Piano Concerto with conductor Stanley Dodds and the Berlin Symphony Orchestra in 2024. The following year, he was re-invited to perform Chopin’s 1st Piano Concerto with conductor Andreas Wittmann at the Berlin Philharmonie. In 2022, he performed Franz Liszt Piano Concerto No.2 with the ECSO, conducted by Leandro Silvera, in the Barbican Complex, London.

=== Prodiges ===
On January 2, 2020, he won season 6 of the French classical music talent show Prodiges, for which he was in the musicians category. In the semi-final, he played the Tchaikovsky's Piano Concerto No. 1, moving to the finals where he played Chopin's Polonaise No. 6 Opus 53. He won the competition and was awarded the trophy from concert pianist Lang Lang, with prize money of 10 thousand euros.

He was awarded the distinction of Bellifontain d’honneur from the mayor of Fontainebleau.

Charities and project

Paul Ji regularly played in the palliative care unit of the Fontainebleau hospital, wishing through music to help people in need. In January 2021, he launched the project called "Music for Good" in French: "Musique pour le bien" which aims to share music with people in need, and to encourage other musicians who wish bring change to the world. In the context of the health crisis, he is notably organizing a virtual concert for the New Year. This initiative receives the Khemka award for social impact from Eton College.

== Albums ==
Paul has recently released his album Piano by Warner Classics, after his win in Prodiges. He has also accompanied Sarah Brightman in her album France.
