= Johann Christian Jacobi =

Johann Christian Jacobi may refer to:

- John Christian Jacobi (1670-1750), German born hymn translator; Keeper of the Royal German Chapel in St James Palace
- Johann Christian Jacobi (oboist) (1719-1784), oboist and composer in Germany
