= Albrecht Mayer =

German oboist (born 1965)

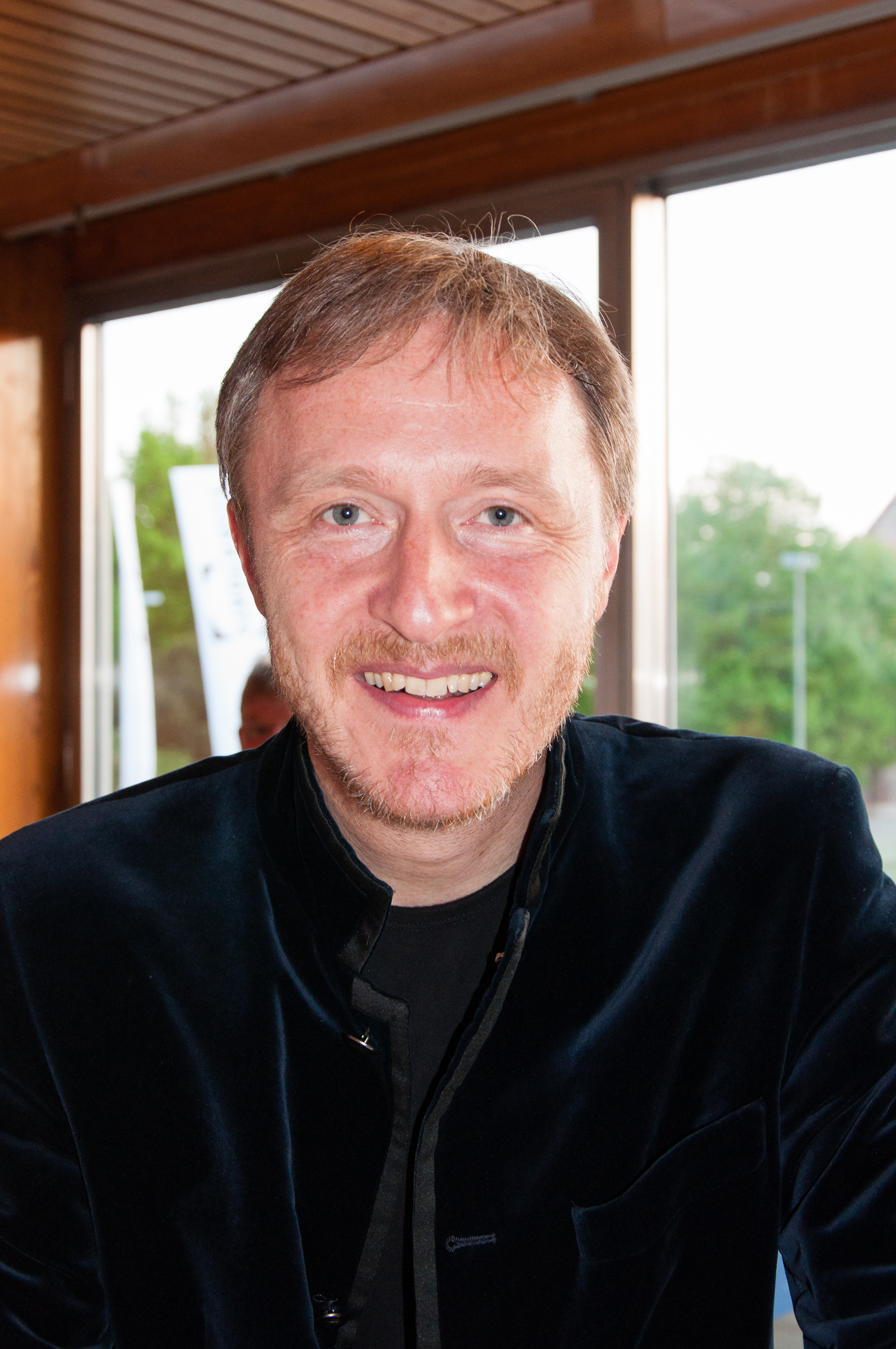
- Born: 3 June 1965 (age 61); Erlangen, Bavaria, Germany
- Occupations: Classical oboist; Principal oboist Conductor
- Organizations: Berlin Philharmonic

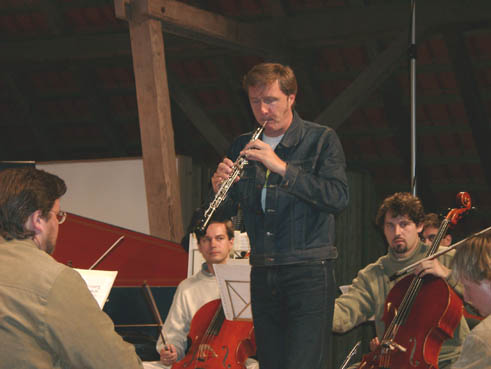
Albrecht Mayer playing

Albrecht Mayer (born 3 June 1965) is a German classical oboist and conductor. The principal oboist of the Berlin Philharmonic, he is internationally known as a soloist and chamber musician and has made many recordings.

== Biography ==
Born in Erlangen, Mayer sang as a child in the choir of the Bamberg Cathedral. He was a student of Gerhard Scheuer, Georg Meerwein, Maurice Bourgue and Ingo Goritzki, and was appointed principal oboist of the Bamberg Symphony Orchestra in 1990. He joined the Berlin Philharmonic as principal oboist in 1992, a position he currently holds together with Jonathan Kelly.

Mayer used to play a Green Line Oboe by the French company Buffet Crampon, but in 2009 switched to a line of wind instruments (oboe, oboe d'amore, and English Horn) named after him by the German instrument makers Gebrüder Mönnig.

Albrecht Mayer plays with ensembles of the Philharmonic, the Berliner Philharmonisches Bläserensemble and the Berlin Philharmonic Winds Soloists, amongst other chamber music ensembles.

== Recordings ==
=== As soloist ===
- Bonjour Paris – Works by Fauré, D'Indy, Françaix, Hahn and Satie. Decca. (2010)
- Albrecht Mayer in Venice (In Venedig) – Works by Marcello, Vivaldi and Albinoni. Decca. (2009)
- New Seasons – transcriptions of music by Handel for oboe and orchestra played by Mayer with the Sinfonia Varsovia (Deutsche Grammophon 476 047)
- Lieder ohne Worte (Songs Without Words) – transcriptions of music by J. S. Bach for oboe and orchestra, Nigel Kennedy (violin) and the Sinfonia Varsovia (Deutsche Grammophon 476 047)
- Auf Mozarts Spuren (In search of Mozart), August 2004, with Claudio Abbado and the Mahler Chamber Orchestra (Deutsche Grammophon 623 1046)
- Music for Oboe, Oboe d'amore, Cor anglais, and Piano – chamber music from the 19th century, with Markus Becker (EMI Classics 5 73167 2)
- J. S. Bach's Double concerto for oboe and violin, with Kennedy (violin) with the Berlin Philharmonic (EMI Classics 5 57016 2)
- Lost and Found – February 2015, Oboenkonzerte des 18. Jahrhunderts von Hoffmeister, Lebrun, Fiala und Koželuh. (Deutsche Grammophon 479 294)

=== Appears on ===
- Serenades for Wind Ensemble, January 2006, EMI Classics
- Opus, by Schiller, September 2013, Deutsche Grammophon
