= Ghez =

Ghez is an Italian surname which derives either from the names Ugo or Sigizo.

== People ==
- Andrea M. Ghez (born 1965), American astrophysicist
- Ariana Ghez (born 1979), American classical oboist
