= Tabuteau =

Tabuteau is a surname. Notable people with the surname include:

- Fletcher Tabuteau (born 1974), New Zealand politician
- Marcel Tabuteau (1887–1966), French-American oboist
