= Eugene Izotov =

Russian oboist (born 1973)

Background information
- Born: Evgeny Aleksandrovich Izotov (Евгений Александрович Изотов); 1973 (age 52–53)
- Genre: Classical
- Occupations: Musician, Educator
- Instrument: Oboe
- Website: www.oboesolo.com

Eugene Izotov (born 1973) is a Russian-born American oboist and recording artist. He is principal oboist of the San Francisco Symphony appointed by Michael Tilson Thomas in 2014. He is the first Russian-born oboist in any major U.S. symphony orchestra. Previously, he was principal oboist of the Chicago Symphony, principal oboist of the Metropolitan Opera, principal oboist of the Kansas City Symphony, and has appeared as guest principal oboe with the Boston Symphony and New York Philharmonic. He studied with American oboist Ralph Gomberg at Boston University, from which he received the Distinguished Alumnus Award. In addition to being recognized as one of the world's premiere orchestral oboists, Izotov has been awarded top prizes at international competitions for solo oboists in Moscow (1990), Saint Petersburg (1991), New York (1995) and the First Prize at the 2001 Fernand Gillet International Oboe competition. Eugene Izotov's solo and chamber music collaborations include partnerships with Bernard Haitink, Riccardo Muti, James Levine, Nicholas McGegan, Michael Tilson Thomas, Jane Glover, Yo Yo Ma, Pinchas Zukerman, Itzhak Perlman, Jaime Laredo, André Watts, Emanuel Ax, Yefim Bronfman, and the Tokyo String Quartet. He has appeared over 70 times as soloist with the Chicago Symphony Orchestra, the Boston Symphony Orchestra, San Francisco Symphony, MET Chamber Ensemble, Pacific Music Festival, Mainly Mozart Festival, and has performed principal oboe on numerous Grammy winning recordings on BMG, Sony Classical, SFS Media, and CSOResound.

Eugene Izotov serves on the oboe faculty at The Colburn School, San Francisco Conservatory of Music, and previously served on the faculty of The Juilliard School and DePaul University. He is a regular guest artist at New World Symphony, Oberlin Conservatory, Juilliard, Cleveland Institute of Music, Lynn University, and Domaine Forget. Since 2003 until 2006 Mr. Izotov served on the faculty of the Verbier Festival, Switzerland. He has served on the woodwind faculties of the Pacific Music Festival founded by Leonard Bernstein in Sapporo, Japan and Music Academy of the West. Eugene Izotov was the oboe mentor for the 2011 YouTube Symphony Orchestra during its residency at the Sydney Opera House in Sydney, Australia which included a live internet simulcast to over 30 million of worldwide viewers. In 2019 Eugene Izotov was invited by Valery Gergiev to serve on the first-ever woodwind jury of the Tchaikovsky International Competition. He has been named a 2025 U.S. Presidential Scholars Program Distinguished Teacher. Many of Izotov's former students are now enjoying careers in Chicago Symphony, San Francisco Symphony, Pittsburgh Symphony, Metropolitan Opera, San Francisco Opera, Saint Louis Symphony, Kansas City Symphony, Louisiana Philharmonic Orchestra, San Diego Symphony, Rochester Philharmonic, Fort Worth Symphony, Buffalo Philharmonic, Sarasota Orchestra, Oregon Symphony, Atlanta Symphony, Jerusalem Symphony Orchestra, and others.
