= Allan Vogel =

American oboist and educator

Allan Vogel is an American oboist and educator. He was the former Principal Oboe of the Los Angeles Chamber Orchestra.

== Education ==
Vogel studied piano and voice at the New York High School for Music and Art, but eventually changed his focus to oboe. "From the moment I heard it, I fell in love", Vogel said. "I switched right away." "My voice hadn't quite changed yet", he says. "By the time my voice changed, I was already into the oboe. I've been fanatical about the oboe ever since. I fell in love with the sound of it, as many people do. I liked playing it, too, physically. I have the right personality for it, kind of tenacious. That's what the oboe takes."

He then attended Harvard University and graduated with a degree in English; however, during his senior year, he decided to concentrate on his oboe playing. He studied with Robert Bloom at Yale University where he received a Doctorate in Performance. He received a Fulbright Fellowship and studied in Berlin with Lothar Koch (former principal, Berlin Philharmonic), and with oboists Fernand Gillet (former principal, Boston Symphony) and Josef Marx.

== Professional career ==
Vogel joined the Los Angeles Chamber Orchestra in 1973 under the baton of Neville Marriner, and is Principal Oboe.

He has performed as guest principal oboe with the Boston Symphony for concerts in the major European capitals, Carnegie Hall, the Kennedy Center and Boston Symphony Hall. In addition, he has served as guest principal oboe with the Los Angeles Philharmonic at the Dorothy Chandler Pavilion, Hollywood Bowl, and Walt Disney Concert Hall. He has also been guest principal with the Berlin Philharmonic, the Academy of St Martin in the Fields, and the Orpheus Chamber Orchestra.

Since 1994, Vogel has often been a guest with the Chamber Music Society of Lincoln Center in New York City and has completed three tours of Japan. In 2000, he was one of eight musicians from the Chamber Music Society to perform at the White House for President Bill Clinton at a state dinner in honor of the Prime Minister of India.

Vogel made his concerto debut at Lincoln Center's Alice Tully Hall with the New York Chamber Symphony. Since then, he has performed as a soloist with many orchestras.

He has been featured at many leading American music festivals, including the Marlboro Music Festival, Santa Fe Chamber Music Festival, Aspen Music Festival, Mostly Mozart Festival, Summerfest, Sarasota Music Festival, Oregon Bach Festival, Music@Menlo and Chamber Music Northwest.

== Academic positions ==
- California Institute of the Arts, founding faculty member
- The Colburn School, Convervatory of Music, faculty member
- University of Southern California, Thornton School of Music: Adjunct Professor of Winds and Percussion
- American Bach Society, Advisory Board member

== Recordings ==
Vogel's discography includes two solo recordings on the Delos label:

- Bach's Circle, featuring Patricia Mabee (Harpsichord); Mark Chatfield (Bass Viola da gamba); Nancy Sartain (Harpsichord), Janice Tipton (flute)
  - Bach: Sonata for Violin and Harpsichord in G minor, BWV 1020
  - Couperin: Concerts royaux
  - Couperin: Concert no 4 in E minor
  - Bach: Sonata in C major
  - Telemann: Trio Sonata(s)
- Oboe Obsession, featuring Brian Pezzone (piano); called "the single finest disc of oboe music ever recorded" by American Record Guide.
  - Saint-Saëns: Sonata for Oboe & Piano in D major, Op. 166
  - Poulenc: Sonata for oboe & piano
  - Britten: Metamorphoses (6) after Ovid for oboe solo, Op. 49
  - Schumann: Romances (3) for oboe (or violin or viola) & piano, Op. 94
  - Wilhelm Friedemann Bach: Duet for 2 flutes No 4 in F major, F 57
  - Makoto Shinohara: Obsession for oboe & piano

In 2003, he recorded the Bach Concerto for oboe and violin with Hilary Hahn and the Los Angeles Chamber Orchestra under Music Director Jeffrey Kahane for Deutsche Grammophon.

He has also appeared on the Nonesuch, Dorian, and RCA labels and has recorded Bach cantatas with Helmuth Rilling.

== Harbor Freeway Overture ==
Vogel is prominently featured in the massive eight-story high mural Harbor Freeway Overture (1991–93) by Kent Twitchell, located on the walls of the Citicorp Plaza parking structure, overlooking 8th Street and the Harbor Freeway (Interstate 110), in Los Angeles, California. It is estimated that over 250,000 people view the mural every day.
