= Thomas Gallant =

Thomas Gallant may refer to:

- Thomas Gallant (musician)
- Thomas Gallant (historian)
