= Philadelphia Youth Orchestra =

Youth orchestra in Pennsylvania, United States

- Founded: 1939
- Headquarters: Philadelphia, Pennsylvania, U.S.
- Key people: Louis Scaglione (CEO)
- Website: www.pyos.org

The Philadelphia Youth Orchestra (PYO) is the flagship symphonic ensemble for advanced youth musicians in Philadelphia, Pennsylvania. It is the principal performing ensemble of the Philadelphia Youth Orchestra Music Institute (PYOMI), offering advanced orchestral training and performance opportunities for young musicians.

The orchestra has played music by such composers as Gustav Mahler, Ludwig van Beethoven, Dmitri Shostakovich, Antonín Dvořák, Igor Stravinsky, Leonard Bernstein, Sergei Prokofiev, Peter Ilyich Tchaikovsky, Richard Wagner, Richard Strauss, and more. The Philadelphia Youth Orchestra has been widely acclaimed by newspapers such as The New York Times, The Philadelphia Inquirer and The UK Post.

In addition to playing local venues such as Marian Anderson Hall at the Kimmel Center, PYO has participated in numerous international tours with sold-out concerts in countries such as Brazil, Poland, Vienna, China, Czech Republic, Italy, Russia, Jordan, Israel, Spain, England, Switzerland, France, Germany, Argentina, Uruguay, The British Isles, and Australia.

== Philadelphia Youth Orchestra Music Institute ==
The PYO Music Institute provides nationally recognized music education and performance experiences to young instrumentalists, while engaging audiences and communities throughout the Greater Delaware Valley Region and beyond. Ranging in age from 5 to 22 years, the musicians of the PYO Music Institute come from a 70-mile radius of Philadelphia, encompassing nearly 20 counties within Pennsylvania, New Jersey, and Delaware.

The organization has eleven programs:

- Philadelphia Youth Orchestra
- Philadelphia Young Artists Orchestra
- Bravo Brass
- Prysm Strings – Main Line
- Tune Up Philly - Orchestral Pathways Program
- Young Musicians Debut Orchestra
- Pizzicato Players
- Philadelphia Youth Jazz Orchestra
- Philadelphia Youth Symphonic Band
- Prysm Strings – New Jersey
- Philadelphia Youth Concert Band

PYOMI also provides summer programming for jazz, band, and string musicians.

Former PYOMI musicians currently hold chairs in most of the top 20 professional orchestras in the United States, with 7 PYO alumni currently serving in The Philadelphia Orchestra.

The PYO Music Institute has been led by several music directors, including Adolph Sorian (1940–1941), J.W.F. Leman (1941–1952), William R. Smith (1952–1954), and Joseph Primavera (1954–2005). Primavera was the longest-serving active conductor of an orchestra. Louis Scaglione, appointed in 1997 by Primavera and the PYOMI board of trustees, currently serves as the PYO Music Institute's president, CEO, and music director.

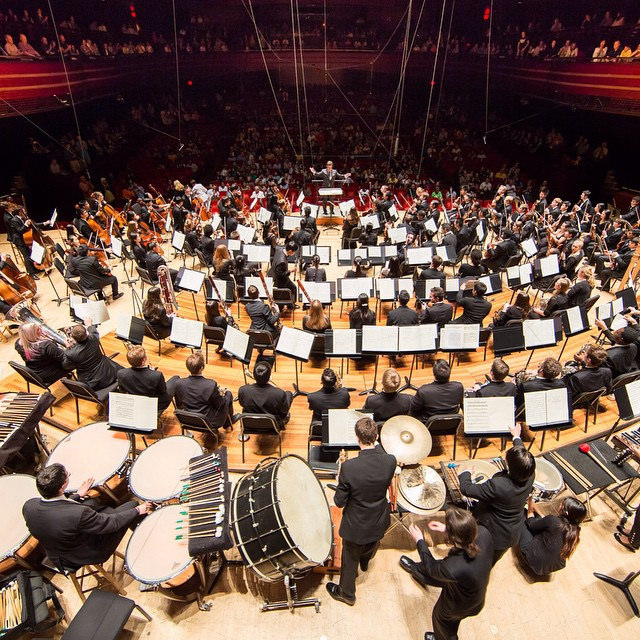
Philadelphia Youth Orchestra in Concert

== Notable alumni ==
- Joseph Hallman, composer
- Elizabeth Pitcairn, violinist
- Troy Peters, viola, conductor, composer
- Jeffrey Milarsky, percussion
- Peter Smith, oboe
- Eric Owens (bass-baritone), oboe
- Christian McBride, bass
- It, cello
