= Susanne Regel =

German oboist (born 1974)

- Born: September 9, 1974 (age 52); Freiburg im Breisgau, Germany
- Genre: Classical
- Occupations: Oboist, teacher
- Instruments: Oboe
- Years active: 2001–present
- Website: www.susanneregel.com

Susanne Regel (born 1974) is a German oboist working as solo artist and with international ensembles. She specializes in baroque oboe, the classical oboe, and the romantic oboe. Regel also teaches at several universities in Germany.

== Education ==
Regel started playing woodwind instruments as a child and began an intensive study of the recorder, modern oboe and also historical oboe when in school. In 1993, Regel made it to the semi-final of the international MAfestival Brugge (Musica Antiqua Bruges) competition in Bruges. She was the youngest participant of the competition. In 2001 she completed her studies of the historical oboe under Ku Ebbinge, and the recorder under Sebastien Marc at the Royal Conservatory of The Hague.

== Career ==
Regel has made more than 50 radio, CD and DVD recordings. A noteworthy achievement is her participation in the complete recording of the Bach cantatas under J.E. Gardiner with the English Baroque Soloists in 2000.

In 1995 she was appointed solo oboe of the internationally acclaimed ensemble Musica Antiqua Köln under Reinhard Goebel.

Regel is a regular guest and soloist with many international ensembles including:

- Freiburger Barockorchester (Petra Müllejans, Gottfried von der Goltz), Germany
- Collegium 1704 (Vaclav Luks), Czech Republic
- le cercle de l’Harmonie"(Jérémie Rhorer), France
- Concerto Copenhagen (Lars Ulrik Mortensen), Denmark
- Amsterdam Baroque Orchestra (Ton Koopman), The Netherlands
- Laura Soave (Sergio Azzolini), Italy

Regel has participated in many international festivals, including:

- Salzburg Festival
- Boston Early Music Festival
- Festival Sansoucci
- Prague Spring International Music Festival
- Festival de Saintes
- Bachwoche Ansbach
- Göttingen International Handel Festival

=== Teaching ===
Regel teaches the historical oboe at the Hochschule für Musik in Karlsruhe, and at the "Staatliche Hochschule für Musik" in Trossingen. She also teaches in international Masterclasses in Essen, Minsk, St. Petersburg, Los Angeles and Washington.
