= Paolo Di Cioccio =

Italian oboist and composer

Paolo Di Cioccio (Rome 16 February 1963 - 2024) is an oboist and composer. He is a professor at the Conservatorium "F. Torrefranca" and the "International Polytechnic Scientia et Ars" in Vibo Valentia, Italy. He was the first oboist who recorded "Oboe Sconcerto" with the music of Albinoni, Vivaldi and Marcello for the oboe together with analog synthesizers (Modular Moog, Arp 2600). He plays a Marigaux oboe.

== Discography ==
- Images (1999)
- Logos (2002)
- Oboe Sconcerto (2005 - Domani Musica)
- Vissi d'oboe (2006 - Domani Musica)
- Tour de France (2007 - Domani Musica)
- The Planets (2007)
