= Lothar Koch =

Lothar Koch may refer to:

- Lothar Koch (musician)
- Lothar Koch (politician)
