= Francesco Besozzi =

Italian oboist

Francesco Besozzi (1766 – 1816) was an oboist and member of a renowned family of wind players. From 1792 to 1816 he was at the service of the royal court of Dresden. He was born and died in Dresden, which was in the Kingdom of Saxony when he died.
