= John Ferrillo =

American oboist

John Ferrillo is an American oboist. He has been the Principal Oboe of the Boston Symphony Orchestra since 2001. He is also a faculty member at the Tanglewood Music Center. Prior to these posts, he was Co-Principal Oboe of the Metropolitan Opera Orchestra in New York from 1986 to 2001 as well as a former teacher at the Juilliard School and Mannes School of Music. Ferrillo studied with John de Lancie at the Curtis Institute of Music.
