= Robert Bloom =

- Born: May 3, 1908; Pittsburgh, Allegheny County, Pennsylvania
- Died: February 13, 1994 (aged 85) Cincinnati, Hamilton County, Ohio
- Genres: Classical
- Occupations: Oboist, composer, arranger, teacher
- Instrument: Oboe

Robert Bloom (May 3, 1908 – February 13, 1994) was an oboist with an orchestral and solo career, a composer and arranger contributing to the oboe repertory, and a teacher of several successful oboists. Bloom is considered seminal in the development of an American school of oboe playing.

At the Curtis Institute of Music Bloom was a pupil of Marcel Tabuteau for three years. In the 1930s he played English horn in the Philadelphia Orchestra under Leopold Stokowski and first oboe in the Rochester Philharmonic under José Iturbi. He was the principal oboe in Arturo Toscanini's NBC Symphony Orchestra from 1937 to 1943. Bloom plays on recordings by the Columbia Symphony and the RCA Symphony.

In 1946 Bloom was one of the founding members of the Bach Aria Group, with which he played until 1980. Recordings by the Bach Aria Group featuring Bloom started appearing from the late 1940s. Bloom transcribed and elaborated 18th-century masterworks for the oboe. His own compositions include a Sonatina for oboe and piano.

Bloom was a professor at Yale and Juilliard. His pupils include William Bennett, Bill Douglas, Tim Hurtz, Richard Killmer, Bert Lucarelli, Ray Still, Allan Vogel, and Richard Woodhams, In the spring of 1988, friends, colleagues, and former pupils gathered in Lincoln Center's Alice Tully Hall in New York for an 80th-birthday tribute.

A few years after Bloom's death in 1994, his widow, Sara Lambert Bloom, published The Robert Bloom Collection, scores and parts to his 21 editions of 18th-century masterworks, 10 transcriptions, and 10 compositions. The Art of Robert Bloom, a 7-CD set of live performances of concertos, chamber music, and Bach arias performed by Bloom over his 60-year career was released in 2001 on Boston Records label.

Bloom's daughter, Kath Bloom is a singer-songwriter and music therapist based in Litchfield, CT.
