= Helen Jahren =

Swedish oboist

Mai Åse Helen Jahren (born 2 May 1959) is a Swedish oboist. Jahren has performed many works by contemporary Swedish composers, such as Sven-David Sandström, André Chini and Mårten Josjö.

== Biography ==
Jahren studied with Heinz Holliger. She has collaborated with Olli Mustonen, Marc-André Hamelin, Sharon Bezaly and numerous other musicians. In 1999 she premiered an Oboe Concerto by Poul Ruders at the inauguration of the Royal Library in Copenhagen; her performance was attended by Queen Margrethe II.

Jahren has performed as a soloist in Europe, the United States, South America and the Far East. Her recordings include concertos by Wolfgang Amadeus Mozart, Johann Sebastian Bach, Alfred Schnittke and chamber music by Benjamin Britten, Arnold Schoenberg and others. Around fifty composers have created new music for Jahren. Jahren gives master classes around the world and teaches oboe performance at the Carl Nielsen Academy of Music in Odense, Denmark. She was made a Life Member of the Royal Swedish Academy of Music in 1998.

Jahren founded the annual Båstad Chamber Music Festival in 1993, and was its artistic director until 2006.

== Awards ==
- 1987 - Swedish Grammy for Best Classical Recording
- 2000 - Spelmannen music prize
- 2003 - Sydsvenskan prize
- 2006 - Medal for the Promotion of the Musical Arts
