= Henri Brod =

French oboist, instrument builder and composer

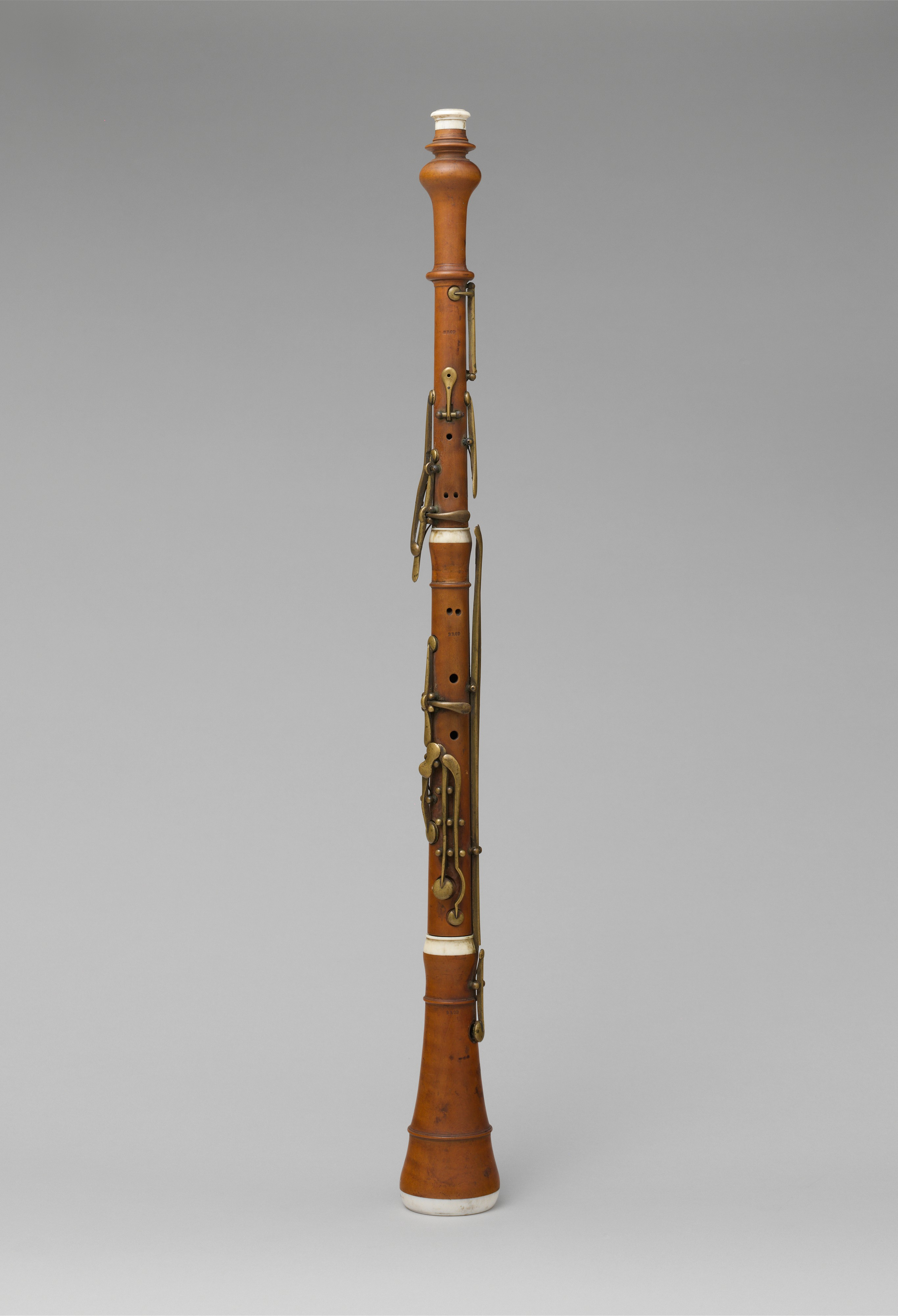
Oboe built by Henri Brod

Henri Brod (June 13, 1799 - April 6, 1839) was a French oboist, instrument builder and composer of the early Romantic Era. Brod was considered a virtuoso and introduced his own innovations in both oboe design and playing style that are still in use today.
