= Eldevina Materula =

Mozambican musician

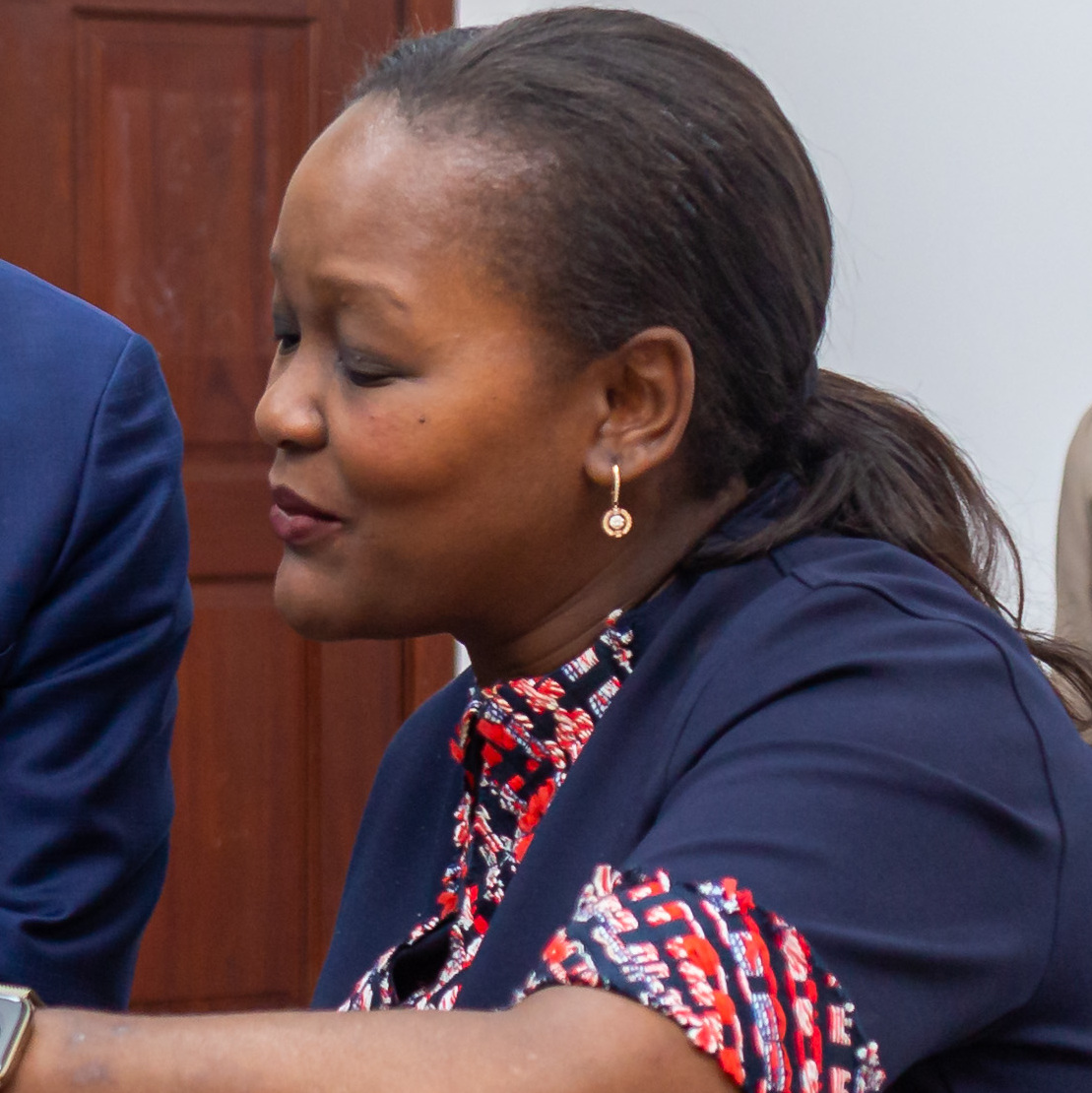
- in 2022

Minister of Culture and Tourism
- Incumbent
- Assumed office 19 January 2020
- President: Filipe Nyusi
- Preceded by: Silva Armando Dunduru

Personal details
- Born: 1982 (age 43–44) Maputo

Eldevina "Kika" Materula (born 1982) is a Mozambican oboist who has served as Minister of Culture and Tourism in the Cabinet of Mozambique since 19 January 2020.

== Life ==
Materula was born in Maputo in 1982. At the age of seven she began studying piano and recorder at the National School of Music. In 1995, aged 13, she began studying the oboe, under an agreement with the Escola Profissional de Música de Évora, in Portugal, which selected her, along with five other students, to study at that institution.

In 2016, she was made an Officer of the Order of Prince Henry by the President of Portugal.
