= Johann Christian Jacobi (oboist) =

German oboist and composer

Johann Christian Jacobi (1719 – 1784) was a German oboist and composer of the Baroque period.

== Life ==
Jacobi was born in Tilsit, Prussian Lithuania (now Sovetsk, Russia). He had his first lessons on the oboe from his father, a skilled player of the violin and oboe. After the premature death of his father, he spent a period of self-tuition before moving to Berlin where he immediately sought lessons with the royal Kammermusicus and famous oboe virtuoso Peter Glösch. In 1746, he was accepted into the Hofkapelle of Frederick the Great and, at this time, began studying composition with his colleague, the flautist Friedrich Wilhelm Riedt.

By 1754, Jacobi was employed as the principal oboist in the Hofkapelle of Frederick the Great's cousin, Charles Frederick Albert, Margrave of Brandenburg-Schwedt in Berlin. On the recommendation of Johann Joachim Quantz, in 1768 King Frederick appointed Jacobi as the director of the Hautboistenschule in Potsdam, responsible for training the nearly 2,000 oboists in the Prussian army.

Jacobi was a member of the "Freitagsakademien" (Friday academies), a musical society which met each Friday at the house of Johann Gottlieb Janitsch. For Jacobi, Janitsch was said to have composed all manner of trios, quartets and concertos in "all the usual and unusual keys". Such pieces allowed Jacobi to improve his skills as an oboist, and earned him a great reputation amongst Berlin's musical societies. Two works by Janitsch bear a dedication to Jacobi, and several other works in extremely uncharacteristic keys for the oboe by Janitsch can be presumed to have been composed for him. They are a testament to his great skill on the instrument. Bruce Haynes lists him among the great oboists of the baroque period.

Unfortunately, no compositions by Jacobi have survived.
