= Carlo Yvon =

Italian composer

Carlo Yvon (29 April 1798 in Milan – 23 December 1854 in Milan) was an Italian composer, virtuoso oboist and English horn player, and music educator. He studied at the Milan Conservatory in his native city and later was a teacher at that school. For many years he served as principal oboist at La Scala. Several of his symphonic and chamber works feature the oboe, many of which are still performed today.

== Selected works ==
- Allegro e variazioni for oboe and orchestra
- Canto notturno for soprano and piano
- Capriccio per tre oboi (Capriccio for 3 Oboes) (composed between 1835 and 1850)
- 2 Duetti for 2 oboes

1. G major
2. E♭ major

- Sonata in F minor for English horn (or viola, or clarinet) and piano (published 1831)
- 6 Studi (6 Etudes) for oboe and piano
- 12 Studi (12 Etudes) for oboe

== Discography ==
- Carlo Yvon: Opera integrale per Oboe (Carlo Yvon: Complete Works for Oboe); Alessandro Baccini (oboe and English horn); Alessandro Cappella (piano); Tactus Records TC.792401 (2004)
- Music for Oboe, Oboe d'amore, Cor anglais & Piano – Sonata for English horn and piano; Albrecht Mayer (English horn), Markus Becker (piano); Angel Records (1999)
- Thomas Stacy: Principal English Horn – Sonata for English horn and piano; Thomas Stacy (English horn), Paul Schwartz (piano); Cala Records CACD0511 (2006)
