= Peter Smith (oboist) =

American oboist

Peter Smith is an American classical musician been associate principal oboe of the Philadelphia Orchestra since 1991.

== Education ==
A graduate of the Curtis Institute of Music, Smith studied with Philadelphia Orchestra Principal Oboe Richard Woodhams; Smith has also studied with Louis Rosenblatt and Marc Lifschey.

== Career ==
Smith has spent summers participating in such festivals as the Colorado Music Festival, where he was principal oboe in 1991. He was featured in the Philadelphia Orchestra’s performance of Martinu’s Sinfonia concertante for violin, oboe, cello, bassoon, and orchestra at the Mann Center for the Performing Arts in July 1994. He was also a soloist in The Philadelphia Orchestra’s Absolutely Mozart Festival in a performance of Mozart’s Quintet for Piano and Winds with pianist Emanuel Ax in June 2003. Smith performed Mozart’s Sinfonia Concertante for Oboe, Clarinet, Horn, Bassoon and Orchestra with the Philadelphia Orchestra in June 2004.

Smith has appeared as soloist with the Lower Merion Symphony, the Bucks County Symphony, the Newark Symphony (Delaware), the Colorado Festival Orchestra, the Curtis Symphony, the Camerata Classica, and the Chamber Orchestra of Philadelphia. He is on the faculty of Temple University, where he is a member of the Conwell Woodwind Quintet.
