= Theodore Baskin =

American musician

Theodore Baskin (born June 14, 1950) has been Principal Oboe of the Montreal Symphony Orchestra since 1980. Born in Detroit, MI, he studied oboe with Arno Mariotti while at Cass Technical High School and John de Lancie while at the Curtis Institute of Music. Prior to his employment in the Montreal Symphony Orchestra, he held posts in the Detroit Symphony Orchestra and the Auckland Symphonia. Additionally, from 2000 to 2002, he was Professor of Oboe at the Indiana University School of Music. Baskin has appeared as soloist in Canada, the United States, Japan, and New Zealand. In addition to the more than 70 recordings with the Montreal Symphony Orchestra and Maestro Charles Dutoit for London/Decca Records, he has recorded four Vivaldi concerti for Chandos Records with I Musici de Montreal and has participated in chamber recordings with Les vents de Montréal for the CBC, Analekta, and Atma labels. In 1989, Baskin traveled to Moscow to give the world premiere of the Concerto for Oboe and 16 Strings by Russian Composer Alexander Raskatov, and in 1994 he premiered the Concerto for Oboe and Orchestra by André Prévost, a prominent Quebec composer, with the Montreal Symphony Orchestra. He is currently Associate Professor of Oboe at the McGill University Schulich School of Music and a participant in numerous summer festivals as both a teacher and a performer. His wife, Karen, is a member of the Montreal Symphony Orchestra cello section.
