= Lothar Koch (musician) =

German oboist (born 1935)

Lothar Koch (1 July 1935 – 16 March 2003) was a German oboist. He was one of the two principal oboists in the Berlin Philharmonic during the Herbert von Karajan era. He was also an active soloist and was regarded as one of the greatest oboe players of his era. One critic described him as the greatest musician of the last 150 years.

He was born in Velbert and studied at the Folkwangschule in Essen. In the nineties, Koch retired from the Berlin Philharmonic and became a lecturer at the Mozarteum University Salzburg.
