= Ralph Gomberg =

American oboist (1921–2006)

Ralph Gomberg

Ralph Gomberg (June 18, 1921 – December 9, 2006) was the principal oboist of the Boston Symphony Orchestra for 37 years (1950–1987). His brother Harold held the same chair with the New York Philharmonic for much of the same period (1943–1977).

== Biography ==
Ralph Gomberg was born in the West End of Boston, Massachusetts, the youngest of seven musically gifted siblings. The family decamped to Philadelphia so that one of the boys, Robert, could study violin at the Curtis Institute of Music where they had heard students were admitted on merit and went tuition-free. At age 14, Gomberg also started studying at the Curtis with legendary oboist Marcel Tabuteau, who had also taught his brother Harold. Ralph was the youngest student ever accepted by Tabuteau. He went on to graduate from Curtis, as had four of his siblings before him.

At age 18, Gomberg became the first oboist in the All-American youth orchestra directed by Leopold Stokowski. He was then recruited in 1941 by Eugene Ormandy to play for the US Navy in Baltimore. After a year of this, he left for Los Angeles to care for an ill brother. While there, he received a call from a young conductor in New York named Leonard Bernstein who was looking for a first oboist for his City Center Orchestra and hired him on the phone. While playing for the City Center Orchestra in New York, Gomberg also played for the Mutual Broadcasting Orchestra, co-founded the New York Woodwind Quintet, and co-founded the Boston Symphony Chamber Players.

In 1950 he joined the Boston Symphony Orchestra and held the principal oboe chair with the BSO for 37 years before retiring. He also served on the faculty of Boston University, New England Conservatory, and Tanglewood Music Center as an adjunct professor. Many of his former students now perform in leading symphony orchestras around the world including the Chicago Symphony, Saint Louis Symphony, San Francisco Symphony, Toronto Symphony, Orquestra Simfonica de Barcelona, the Boston Pops, and Israel Philharmonic.

He died at age 85 in a hospice in Massachusetts of primary lateral sclerosis. His wife, Sydelle, was Director of the Boston Ballet School, the school of Boston Ballet Company.
