= Thomas Gallant (musician) =

American oboist

- Instrument: Oboe

Thomas Gallant is an American oboist who performs with the Adaskin String Trio as well as other chamber music groups. Gallant is managing director of General Arts Touring, Inc., a classical and contemporary musicians agency.

== Biography ==
=== Early life and education ===
Gallant studied at the Jacobs School of Music at Indiana University, United States, with Jerry Sirucek.

=== Career ===
Considered by many to be the most difficult of all the musical instruments, the oboe is often called the "ill wind that no one blows good." Oboist Thomas Gallant is one of the world's few virtuoso solo and chamber music performers on this instrument and he has been praised by The New Yorker magazine as "a player who unites technical mastery with intentness, charm and wit." Thomas Gallant is a First Prize Winner of the Concert Artists Guild International New York Competition. His performances have taken him to Avery Fisher Hall, Weill Recital Hall and the Frick Collection in New York City, to Washington, DC, Los Angeles, Chicago, Philadelphia, to the Spoleto Festival in Italy, and to the Mostly Mozart Festival at Lincoln Center. He has appeared as guest soloist with the Kronos Quartet at the Ravinia Festival and has collaborated with flutist Jean-Pierre Rampal, with Cuarteto Casals, the Colorado, Calder and Lark Quartets, Cuarteto Latinoamericano and with the Adaskin String Trio. Recent and upcoming performances include a concert of solo and chamber music works for the oboe at the Library of Congress in Washington, DC, and tours across the United States as soloist with Camerata Bariloche from Argentina performing concerti by J. S. Bach and Vaughan Williams. Thomas Gallant is dedicated to performing neglected and contemporary works for the oboe and has given the New York premieres of works for oboe and strings by Berio and Penderecki as well as the Washington, DC premiere of Elliot Carter's Quartet for oboe and strings. This season he will release a recording of the Mozart oboe quartet and be featured in a documentary about the Three Romances for oboe and piano of Robert Schumann. He is a member of the trio Ensemble Schumann.

Thomas Gallant was born into a large working-class family to a Portuguese mother and French father outside of Boston. When he first brought home an oboe from the local band program his family was rather disappointed as they did not know what an oboe was and asked him to "go back to school and return it for an instrument like all the other kids play such as the trumpet or clarinet". After initial successes at a young age he stopped performing for many years and only in recent years has he returned to performing "the ill wind that no one blows good". Thomas Gallant lives in New York City.

== Awards ==
Concert Artists Guild International New York Competition
