= Melvin Berman (musician) =

American oboist (1927–2008)

- Born: 28 February 1927; Hartford, Connecticut, United States
- Died: 2 April 2008 (aged 81) Toronto, Ontario, Canada
- Genres: Classical
- Occupation: Instrumentalist
- Instrument: Oboe

Melvin Berman (28 February 1927 – 2 April 2008) was the solo oboist of the Montreal Symphony Orchestra and the Radio-Canada orchestra in Montreal, as well as a member of the Baroque Trio of Montreal.

== Early life ==
Berman was born in Hartford, Connecticut in 1927. He received his Bachelor and Master of Music degrees from Hartt College of the University of Hartford where he studied the oboe with Clement Lenom of the Boston Symphony and Harold Gomberg of the New York Philharmonic. Upon graduation, Berman was appointed a member of the faculty where he taught theory, oboe, and chamber music.

== Career ==
Before joining the Montreal Symphony Orchestra, Berman held several orchestral posts including solo oboist of the New Orleans Philharmonic, The Ballet Theater of New York, and the Boston Pops Orchestra under Arthur Fiedler. He performed under the baton of most of the world's great conductors of his time including Pierre Monteux, Charles Munch, Josef Krips, Erich Leinsdorf, Thomas Schippers, Georg Solti, and Zubin Mehta.

Berman taught at McGill University from 1956 to 1964, and was also a member of the faculty of the Conservatoire de musique du Québec à Montréal. In 1972, he moved to Toronto to teach at the University of Toronto. He was appointed head of woodwinds there in 1988. While in Toronto, Berman also served as principal oboe for the Canadian Opera Company orchestra from 1975 to 2004.

In addition to his orchestra activities, Berman performed extensively as a soloist, recitalist, and chamber music player. He was a composer and orchestrator whose works were performed regularly.
