= Bruce Haynes =

American-Canadian musician and musicologist

Bruce Haynes (April 14, 1942 – May 17, 2011) was an American and Canadian oboist, recorder player, musicologist and specialist in historical performance practice.

== Biography ==
Bruce Haynes was born in Louisville, Kentucky, in 1942 and began playing the recorder and oboe at an early age. His father also played the recorder and oboe and was a music teacher. Haynes died on May 17, 2011, in Montreal, Quebec, aged 69.

== Training ==
After studying the modern oboe with Raymond Dusté and John de Lancie, Haynes moved to the Netherlands, where he studied early music performance from 1964 to 1967 with Frans Brüggen and Gustav Leonhardt at the Royal Conservatory of The Hague. In 1995 he was awarded a Ph.D. in musicology by the Université de Montréal for a study of historical pitch standards.

== Career ==
=== Performing ===
Haynes began his performing career on the modern oboe in 1960, playing with orchestras in San Francisco (the San Francisco Ballet and Opera orchestras) and Jalapa, Mexico. In 1964 he moved to the Netherlands to study early music performance and began playing the early oboe, or hautboy. Haynes was one of the first 20th-century performers to master the hautboy and was a key figure in setting professional performance standards for it. In the mid-1970s he reintroduced the hautboy to 20th-century France, and was among the first to perform on the instrument in Britain, Italy, and Israel. Haynes performed with period instrument ensembles until the early 2000s and made a number of solo and ensemble recordings. He was a founding member of the San Francisco-based Philharmonia Baroque Orchestra, along with his wife and long-time musical partner, baroque cellist and gambist Susie Napper. He performed and/or recorded with Frans Brüggen, Gustav Leonhardt, Sigiswald Kuijken and Barthold Kuijken, among others.

=== Instrument-making ===
Haynes was apprenticed to Friedrich von Huene in Boston, Massachusetts, learning to make copies of original Baroque woodwinds. In 1969 he opened his own workshop in California. Subsequently, Haynes devoted himself to performing and research.

=== Teaching ===
Haynes substituted for Frans Brüggen at the Royal Conservatory of The Hague. He also started a class in hautboy there, the first in the Netherlands, which he taught until the early 1980s. Haynes was an associate professor of the Université de Montréal and McGill University in Montreal, Quebec, Canada. He was also frequently invited as a guest lecturer by other universities and musical associations.

=== Research and writing ===
Haynes' interest in the hautboy and in historical performance practice has led to much research and writing. He wrote a number of articles and books (see list below) and was a contributor to MGG and the New Grove Dictionary of Music. Areas of research include the construction, repertory and playing techniques of the hautboy; the history of pitch; historical performance practice; rhetoric; eloquence and the Passions. Haynes held various doctoral and postdoctoral fellowships from the Social Sciences and Humanities Research Council of Canada and was senior fellow of the Canada Council for the Arts in 2003.

=== Bach arrangements ===
In 2011, shortly after Haynes' death, a compact disc was released by the Montréal Baroque conducted by Eric Milnes with six "New Brandenburg concertos Nos. 7-12" by Johann Sebastian Bach. Bruce Haynes had arranged Bach cantata movements into concertos in the same manner as Bach used to rework his own compositions. "These concertos are not meant as serious reconstructions", Haynes wrote in the cd-booklet, "merely as speculative trials to demonstrate the possibilities for instrumental treatment of Bach's rich fund of musical inventions contained in the cantatas and other vocal works".

== Selected writings ==
- Music for Oboe, 1650–1800: a Bibliography (Berkeley, 1985, 2/1992)
- Lully and the Rise of the Oboe as seen in Works of Art, EMc, xvi (1988), 324–38
- Pitch Standards in the Baroque and Classical Periods (diss., U. of Montreal, 1995)
- A History of Performing Pitch: The Story of A (Scarecrow Press, 2002) ISBN 0-8108-4185-1
- The Eloquent Oboe: A History of the Hautboy from 1640 to 1760 (Oxford University Press, 2001) ISBN 0-19-816646-X
- The Oboe (with Geoffrey Burgess), (Yale University Press, 2004) ISBN 0-300-09317-9
- The End of Early Music: A Period Performer's History of Music for the Twenty-First Century (Oxford University Press, 2007)
