= Richard Woodhams =

American oboist (born 1949)

Richard Woodhams (né Richard Clarence Woodhams; born June 17, 1949, in Palo Alto, California) is an American oboist and recording artist. He was Principal Oboe of the Philadelphia Orchestra from 1977 until his retirement in August 2018. He also served as Professor of Oboe at the Curtis Institute of Music from 1985 until his dismissal in 2021.

At the age of fifteen, Woodhams was accepted by the Curtis Institute and began study with John de Lancie, graduating in 1968. In 1969, he won the position of principal oboe with the St. Louis Symphony Orchestra under music director Walter Susskind. He assumed the position of principal oboe of the Philadelphia Orchestra in 1977, succeeding his teacher. He succeeded de Lancie as oboe instructor at the Curtis Institute in 1985. He is faculty member at the Aspen Music Festival and has taught at the Luzerne and Sarasota Music Festivals, among others.

Woodhams's teachers include Raymond Dusté, John de Lancie, John Mack, Robert Bloom, and Jean-Louis LeRoux.

Woodhams's students hold principal positions in many major orchestras, such as the Chicago Symphony (William Welter), New York Philharmonic (Liang Wang), Houston Symphony (Jonathan Fischer), Pittsburgh Symphony (Cynthia Koledo DeAlmeida), Baltimore Symphony (Katherine Needleman), and Atlanta Symphony (Elizabeth Koch Tiscione); other students in major orchestras include Robert Walters, English Hornist of the Cleveland Orchestra, Shea Scruggs, Assistant Principal Oboe of the Baltimore Symphony Orchestra, Jonathan Blumenfeld, Second Oboist of the Philadelphia Orchestra, Peter Smith, Associate Principal Oboe of the Philadelphia Orchestra, and Susan Spector, Second Oboist of the Metropolitan Opera Orchestra.
