= Margaret Griebling-Haigh =

American composer (born 19960)

Margaret "Margi" Griebling-Haigh (born 1960) is an American composer and oboist. Her work includes chamber music, orchestral compositions, vocal music, and opera.

== Early life and education ==
Griebling-Haigh was born in Akron, Ohio, into a musical family. She began composing in childhood and studied piano and oboe from an early age. She was a member of the Cleveland Orchestra Children's Chorus and the Blossom Festival Children's Chorus.

She studied piano with Margaret Baxtresser and oboe with Cleveland Orchestra musicians Harvey McGuire and John Mack, and served as principal oboist and a concerto competition winner with both the Akron Youth Symphony and the University Circle Youth Orchestra.

She earned a bachelor of music degree in oboe performance from the Eastman School of Music and a master's degree from the San Francisco Conservatory of Music, and spent several summers studying at the Pierre Monteux Memorial School. She later performed as an oboist and English horn player with orchestras in New York and Ohio.

== Career ==
=== Early career ===
Griebling-Haigh received early recognition through national competitions, including a BMI Student Composer Award in 1975 and first prize in the Music Teachers National Association Collegiate Division for Songs for Young Lovers in 1985.

She won first prize in the National Federation of Music Clubs' Orchestral Competition for Atalanta (1978), which was described by the Lancaster New Era as "modern and contemporary in concept" while avoiding "the clinical and the sterile," noting its careful construction and rhythmic precision.

In 1979 and 1983, the Huntingdon Trio of Philadelphia commissioned Goldsmith's Pasticcio and Collioure, respectively, and performed both works at the National Gallery of Art in Washington, D.C. Writing in The Plain Dealer, Donald Rosenberg described Collioure as moving "from brooding utterances to episodes of dramatic anguish", and "saturated with haunting inflections", noting stylistic traces of Ravel and Poulenc.

Homages (Symphony No. 1) (1989) was commissioned and premiered by the Schenectady Symphony Orchestra. The Schenectady Gazette described Griebling-Haigh as having "an outstanding ear for orchestral effect" and as one who "understands the need for wit."

=== Commissions and collaborations ===
An active member of the Cleveland Composers Guild since 1991, Griebling-Haigh has received commissions from organizations including the International Double Reed Society, the Meg Quigley International Bassoon Competition, and the International Society of Bassists.

Her 2021 required double bass solo competition work, Computatis Maledictis, was featured on Performance Today.

Her works have been performed by ensembles including the Akron Symphony Orchestra, Cleveland Chamber Symphony, and Cleveland Jazz Orchestra, as well as chamber groups such as the Poiesis Quartet and Factory Seconds Brass.

In 2018, her Rhapsody for violin and piano was premiered by violinist Peter Otto and pianist Randall Fusco.

She has also received commissions from performers such as oboist John Mack, hornist Richard King, and organist Karel Paukert.

=== Instrumental music ===
Recurring in Griebling-Haigh's output are the Bocadillos, a series of descriptive multi-movement suites for solo instrument and piano. In a review of her Bocadillos Floridianos in the Journal of the International Double Reed Society, Robert R. Krause praised her ability to write music that "really paints pictures" and described the suite as "very well written for both the oboe and the piano."

Of Bocadillos Panorámicos, the Journal of the American Viola Society wrote that it is "an excellent example of a substantial new work that should leave audiences satisfied, engaged, and eager to hear more."

In American String Teacher, Andrew Kohn described Bocadillos Iberianos as "recognizably Spanish, but fresh and inventive, with marvelous attention to register."

A review in the Cambridge University Press journal Tempo described her trio Trocadillos (2003) as a "light-hearted but in no way trifling" three-movement suite, noting its incorporation of flamenco-influenced rhythms and a harmonic language that is modernist while remaining tonally grounded.

Writing in The Plain Dealer, Donald Rosenberg described the piano trio Vistas desde el Balcón (1997) as containing "Russian elements suggesting Prokofiev's brooding lyricism and Shostakovich's mystery and anger," calling it "a stunning explosion of ideas."

Textura described Cantilena for eight cellos as a travelogue that evolves from a dark opening into more fluid and lyrical textures, employing cross-rhythms to animate the ensemble.

Her trio Windrush Madrigals has also been reviewed in American Record Guide, which compared its musical language to that of Samuel Barber.

Alegrías, originally conceived for a mixed ensemble including accordion, oboe, percussion, winds, piano, and strings, has appeared in multiple versions. It was arranged for chamber orchestra and choreographed for performance by Verb Ballets in collaboration with the Cleveland Chamber Symphony, and an orchestral version was premiered in 2025 by the Akron Symphony Orchestra under the direction of Christopher Wilkins as part of the city's bicentennial celebrations.

=== Vocal music ===
Griebling-Haigh has written extensively for the voice. Her works include Lufthaltenlieder (Songs of Breathlessness), setting texts by Goethe, Heine, and Hölderlin for soprano, clarinet, horn, and piano; and Sieben Zungenbrecher Lieder (Seven Tongue Twister Songs) for baritone and piano. Her Kipling Songs cycle sets texts by Rudyard Kipling and has been performed by a range of professional artists.

For soprano and eight cellos, Voices from the Other Side (1999) sets texts by Edna St. Vincent Millay on themes of memory, death, and the afterlife. In a review in Fanfare, Colin Clarke wrote that "the writing for cello ensemble is masterly, the setting of the verse perfect."

She has composed several song cycles to poetry by Millay, including Songs for Young Lovers, Sonnets for Young Lovers, and Sonnets of Resignation. Her choral works include The Earth Abideth Forever (2007), commissioned for Epworth United Methodist Church.

=== Dramatic music ===
The Higgler (2017) is a two-act chamber opera for which Griebling-Haigh wrote both the music and libretto, based on a short story by A. E. Coppard. The fully staged world premiere took place on June 7–8, 2025, in Cleveland Heights, Ohio, with a sixteen-piece chamber orchestra conducted by Steven Smith and directed by Marla Berg. A review in ClevelandClassical.com described the opera as "curious, yet charming" and "completely engrossing," noting its juxtaposition of "sharp comedy" with deeper emotional weight, and observed that its ambiguous ending adhered closely to Coppard's text.

The White Trout (2012; revised 2018) is a narrated chamber opera in one act based on an Irish folk tale. The libretto draws on versions recorded by Samuel Lover and W. B. Yeats and was expanded by the composer to include passages in Irish Gaelic. Released online in 2020, it was described by ClevelandClassical.com as accessible to younger audiences while retaining musical sophistication.

Griebling-Haigh has also composed narrated works for children and families. Askelad and the Seven Silver Ducks (2007), based on a Norwegian folk tale, received a Jerome Composer Commission from the American Composers Forum and was issued as a combined recording and illustrated book.

Histoire de Babar le petit éléphant (1995), for narrator and chamber ensemble, was presented by Young Audiences organizations in Cleveland and Minneapolis and later recorded by OboeBass! with pianist William Eddins and narrator Steve Staruch. The Double Reed praised these works for their imaginative scoring and effective use of instrumental color.

=== Works ===
A complete list of Griebling-Haigh's works is available on her website.

Selected works include:

- Voices from the Other Side (1999)
- Vistas desde el Balcón (1997)
- Bocadillos Floridianos (2000)
- Kipling Songs (2003; rev. 2013)
- Alegrías (2009; arr. 2019; arr. 2025)
- Sinfonia Concertante (2010)
- Sortilège (2011)
- Sonnets of Resignation (2011)
- The White Trout (2012; rev. 2018)
- The Higgler (2017)

=== Style and reception ===
Writing in Gramophone in 2005 and again in 2013, Donald Rosenberg noted Griebling-Haigh's "penchant for exotic atmospheres" and described her music as possessing a "rich and haunting personality," mentioning her imaginative instrumentation and rhythmic vitality.

A review in the American Record Guide highlighted her evocative musical language and the interplay of melodic and textural elements in her chamber works.

Griebling-Haigh's music has been broadcast on nationally syndicated programs including Performance Today and Pipedreams, and her works have appeared on labels including Navona Records, MSR Classics, and Centaur Records.

=== Other activities ===
In addition to composing, Griebling-Haigh has worked as a music copyist and editor, preparing performance materials for publishers and ensembles.

She has served as Composer-in-Residence at the Kent/Blossom Music Festival since 2011 and has been active in the Cleveland Composers Guild, including leadership and educational initiatives. She has also been involved in the Guild's "Creativity: Learning through Experience" program, which pairs young musicians with composers.

== Personal life ==
Griebling-Haigh resides in Cleveland Heights, Ohio. In 1989, she married Scott Haigh, who served as First Assistant Principal Double Bass of the Cleveland Orchestra from 1978 to 2022. They have one daughter, Gabrielle Haigh, a soprano.

Her parents were composers Mary Ann Griebling (1936–2023) and Stephen T. Griebling (1932–2020), and her sister, Karen Griebling (born 1957), is a composer and violist based in Conway, Arkansas.
