= Jonathan Kelly (oboist) =

English oboist (born 1969)

- Born: 1969 (age 55–56); Petersfield, England
- Genres: Classical
- Occupation: Principal oboist of the Berlin Philharmonic
- Instrument: Oboe
- Member of: Berlin Philharmonic (2003–present)
- Formerly of: City of Birmingham Symphony Orchestra (1991–2003)

Jonathan Kelly (born 1969) is an English oboist. He is Principal Oboe in the Berlin Philharmonic.

Kelly was born in 1969 and was educated at Magdalen College School, Brackley, Northants, UK, where he began playing the oboe. He won a County Music Scholarship which enabled him to study with Helen Armstrong. While at school he played in the National Youth Orchestra of Great Britain and later in the European Community Youth Orchestra where he was the first recipient of the Mick Baines Award. He took a degree in history at Cambridge and then studied under Celia Nicklin at the Royal Academy of Music, where he won the President's Prize. Further studies were undertaken in Paris with Maurice Bourgue. Kelly is a visiting tutor at the Royal Birmingham Conservatoire and the Royal Academy of Music.

In 1991, he was appointed Principal Oboe in the City of Birmingham Symphony Orchestra, under Simon Rattle, where he remained until 2003 when he was appointed Solo (Principal) Oboe in the Berlin Philharmonic, also under Rattle.
