= Elaine Douvas =

American oboist

Elaine Douvas is an American oboist who served as Principal Oboe of the Metropolitan Opera Orchestra in New York City from 1977 until 2024. She has been Instructor of Oboe at The Juilliard School since 1982 and has served as Chairman of the Woodwind Department since 1997. She teaches at Mannes School of Music in New York City, the Bard College Conservatory of Music in Annandale-on-Hudson, NY. She has been an Artist/Faculty member the Aspen Music Festival and School since 1997, and has taught the oboe seminars for the Hidden Valley Music Seminars (Carmel, CA) since 2007.

Her primary studies were with John Mack at the Cleveland Institute of Music and at the Interlochen Arts Academy with Don Th. Jaeger, Jay Light, and Robert Morgan. Prior to joining the Met, she was Principal Oboe of the Atlanta Symphony under conductor Robert Shaw.

Her solo recordings are issued by Boston Records, Oboe Classics, and Music Minus One.
