= Andreas Wittmann =

German oboist (born 1961)

- Born: May 5, 1961 (age 65); Munich, Germany
- Genres: Classical
- Occupations: Musician, conductor
- Instrument: Oboe
- Member of: Berlin Philharmonic
- Formerly of: Bayreuth Festival Orchestra

Andreas Wittmann is a German oboist and conductor.

== Career ==
Born into a musical family, Wittmann began learning the piano at the age of 8. During a family vacation in Salzburg, he became interested in the oboe and began studying it at the age of 12 with Heinz Brune.

He studied at the University of Music and Theatre Munich under Manfred Clement and at the Berlin University of the Arts under Hansjörg Schellenberger. He also studied conducting in Munich with Hermann Michael and Sergiu Celibidache. He won first prize in the Young Musicians competition in 1977.

In 1986, he was appointed to the Berlin Philharmonic. In 1988, he became a founding member of the Berlin Philharmonic Wind Quintet. He has also performed as principal oboist of the Bayreuth Festival Orchestra. He taught at the Berlin Philharmonic's Karajan Academy and served as its general manager from 2013 to 2015.

He is the permanent guest conductor of the Orquesta Sinfónica Salvador de Bahia in Brazil. He also conducts the Sinfonie-Orchester Berlin and the Sibelius-Orchester Berlin.
