= Marc Lifschey =

- Born: June 16, 1926; New York City
- Died: November 8, 2000 (aged 74) Portland, Oregon
- Genre: Classical
- Occupation: Oboist
- Instrument: Oboe

Marc Lifschey (June 16, 1926 – November 8, 2000) was an American oboist who played principal oboe for the Cleveland Orchestra, the San Francisco Symphony, the Metropolitan Opera Orchestra, and the Buffalo Philharmonic Orchestra over the course of his life.

== Career ==
Marc Lifschey was born on June 16, 1926, in New York City. His father, Elias Lifschey, was a violist who was a member of the NBC Symphony Orchestra. Lifschey attended the Curtis Institute of Music, where he studied with Marcel Tabuteau. Lifschey played in the Buffalo Philharmonic for a short period of time before being appointed to principal oboe of the National Symphony Orchestra, a post which he held between 1948 and 1950. After playing with the National Symphony Orchestra, Lifschey became first oboe of the Cleveland Orchestra under George Szell. Lifschey held this post from 1950 to 1965, with the exception of the 1959–1960 season, during which he played principal oboe for the Metropolitan Opera Orchestra. After leaving Cleveland because of a famous personality clash with Szell, Lifschey went to the San Francisco Symphony, where he was co-principal under Josef Krips before being appointed principal in his own right.

In 1984, William Redington Hewlett endowed the Edo de Waart chair for principal oboe, a seat which Lifschey occupied until his retirement from orchestra playing in 1986.

Lifschey was also an established teacher who was a faculty member at the San Francisco Conservatory of Music and the Jacobs School of Music, part of Indiana University.

== Death ==
Lifschey died at the age of 74 from a bone marrow disorder.
