= John de Lancie (oboist) =

American oboist (1921–2002)

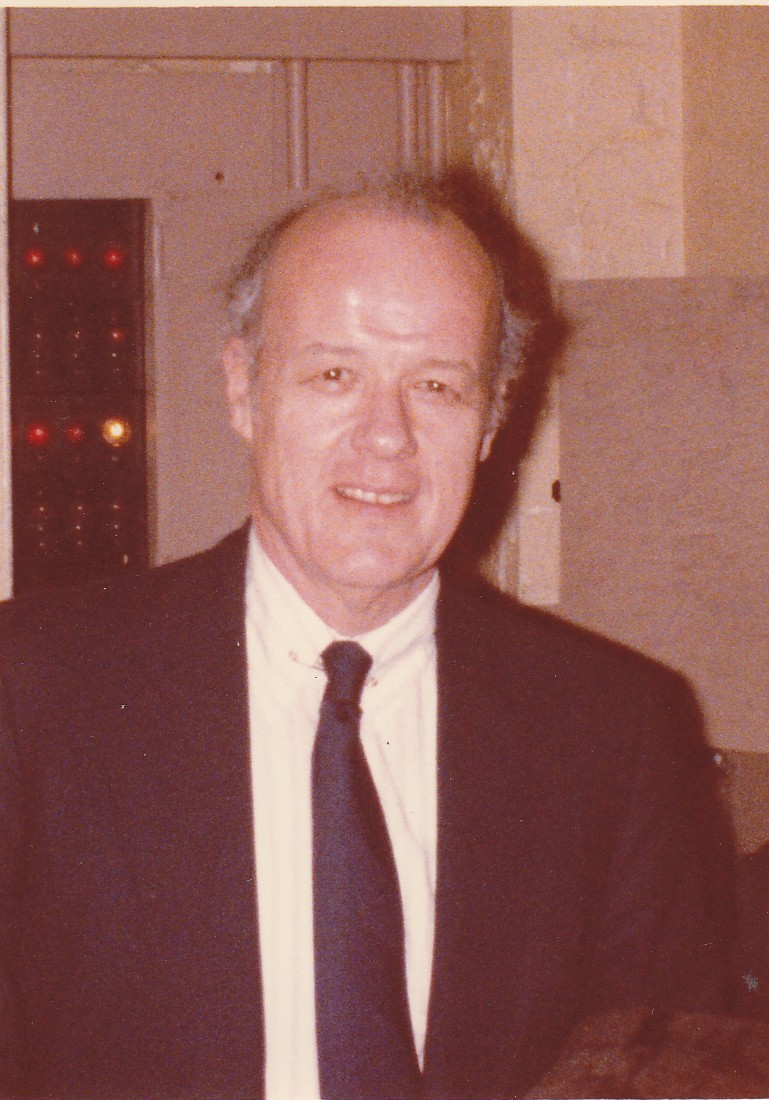
- De Lancie in 1979

Background information
- Born: John Sherwood de Lancie; July 26, 1921; Berkeley, California, U.S.
- Died: May 17, 2002 (aged 80) Walnut Creek, California, U.S.
- Genres: Classical
- Occupations: Principal oboe of Philadelphia Orchestra; Director of Curtis Institute of Music
- Instrument: Oboe

John Sherwood de Lancie (July 26, 1921 – May 17, 2002) was an American oboist and arts administrator. He was principal oboist of the Philadelphia Orchestra for 23 years and also director of the Curtis Institute of Music.

== Biography ==
De Lancie was born in Berkeley, California. Starting in 1940, he was principal oboist of the Pittsburgh Symphony Orchestra under Fritz Reiner. In 1942, he enlisted and served in the US military during World War II, performing with the US Army Band. He met Richard Strauss during his tour of duty as a soldier in Europe at the end of World War II. De Lancie knew Strauss's orchestral writing for oboe thoroughly and asked the composer if he had ever considered writing an oboe concerto. The composer answered simply "no" and the topic was dropped. Six months later, de Lancie was astonished to see that Strauss had changed his mind and was indeed publishing an Oboe Concerto. Strauss saw to it that the rights to the U.S. premiere were assigned to de Lancie. However, de Lancie had joined the Philadelphia Orchestra in 1946 as a section oboist, so that as a junior member and under orchestral protocol, he was not able to premiere the concerto since Philadelphia's principal oboist, Marcel Tabuteau, had seniority. De Lancie then gave the rights to perform the premiere to a young oboist friend at the CBS Symphony in New York, Mitch Miller, who later became famous as a music producer and host of a sing-along TV show.

De Lancie became principal oboe of the Philadelphia Orchestra in 1954, and held the post until 1977. He also performed with chamber ensembles such as the Philadelphia Woodwind Quintet. He also commissioned a piece for oboe and orchestra L'horloge de flore (The Flower Clock) by the composer Jean Françaix. He taught at the Curtis Institute of Music, and served as its director from 1977 to 1985. At the time of his death, de Lancie was one of the few remaining students of Marcel Tabuteau of Curtis. One of his own students, Richard Woodhams, eventually succeeded him as principal oboe in the Philadelphia Orchestra. His former student of the same time, Peter Bloom, aided by de Lancie, published in detail the history of the Strauss Oboe Concerto and de Lancie's role in its creation.

De Lancie died in Walnut Creek, California, in 2002 of leukemia. His wife Andrea, whom he met in Paris during the war, survived him (born July 3, 1920 – died October 18, 2006), as did their son, actor John de Lancie, and their daughter Christina (b. November 21, 1953), and de Lancie's brother Richard.
