= John Mack (musician) =

American oboist (1927–2006)

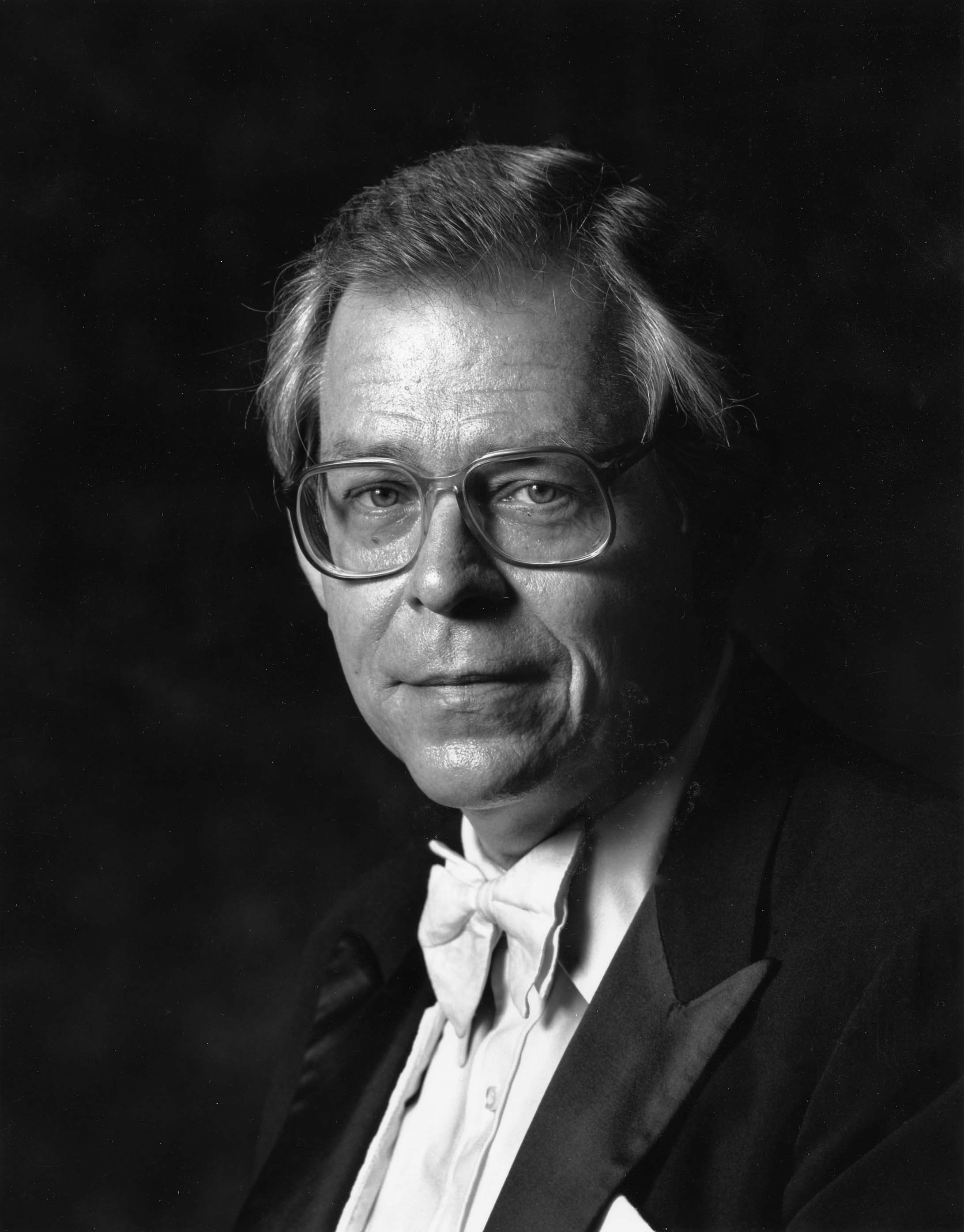
- Born: October 30, 1927; Somerville, New Jersey, U.S.
- Died: July 23, 2006 (aged 78); Cleveland, Ohio, U.S.
- Education: Juilliard School; Curtis Institute of Music
- Occupation: Oboist
- Known for: Principal oboist of the Cleveland Orchestra (1965–2001)

John Mack (October 30, 1927 – July 23, 2006) was an American oboist.

== Biography ==
Born in Somerville, New Jersey, Mack attended the Juilliard School of Music, studying oboe with Harold Gomberg and Bruno Labate and then at the Curtis Institute of Music with Marcel Tabuteau, the longtime principal oboe of the Philadelphia Orchestra.

His first professional experience was with the Sadler Wells Ballet's American tour in 1951–1952. Afterwards he was appointed principal oboist of the New Orleans Symphony, taught briefly at Louisiana State University, and then played with the National Symphony Orchestra from 1963 to 1965. He was also principal oboist at the Casals Festivals in Prades and Perpignan, France.

Mack was appointed by George Szell as principal oboist of the Cleveland Orchestra in 1965, succeeding Marc Lifschey, and remained there playing under Szell and his successors Lorin Maazel and Christoph von Dohnanyi until 2001 when he retired.

"Teaching," Mack once said, "is close to a sacred duty." He was the chairman of oboe studies at the Cleveland Institute of Music and served on the faculty of the Juilliard School of Music in New York and Hartt School in Hartford. He also taught at the John Mack Oboe Camp, a yearly summer event established by Mack's student and former principal oboe of the New York Philharmonic, Joseph Robinson, in Little Switzerland, North Carolina. His students include his Cleveland Orchestra successor Frank Rosenwein.

Ellen Taaffe Zwilich's Oboe Concerto was commissioned by the Cleveland Orchestra to honor his 25th anniversary with the orchestra, and he performed the world premiere.

John Mack died in Cleveland, Ohio of brain cancer at the age of 78.

== The John Mack Oboe Camp ==
Mack began the John Mack Oboe Camp (JMOC) in 1976 to give more people access to excellent oboe teaching and mentoring; it is held each year in early summer at Wildacres in Little Switzerland, North Carolina, on the Blue Ridge Parkway. The teaching legacy that Mack inspired and instilled is a summer tradition at Wildacres Retreat. A long-standing institution for many oboists, the camp has seen the "who's who" of oboists pass through its doors since 1976.
