= Marcel Tabuteau =

- Born: July 2, 1887; Compiègne, Oise, France
- Died: January 4, 1966 (aged 78)
- Occupations: Oboist, Curtis Institute of Music teacher
- Instrument: Oboe
- Formerly of: Philadelphia Orchestra

Marcel Tabuteau (2 July 1887 – 4 January 1966) was a French-American oboist who is considered the founder of the American school of oboe playing.

== Life ==
Tabuteau was born in Compiègne, Oise, France, and given a post in the city's municipal wind band at age eleven. He then studied at the Conservatoire de Paris with the legendary oboist Georges Gillet.

Walter Damrosch brought Tabuteau, along with French musicians flutist Georges Barrère, bassoonist Auguste Mesnard, clarinetist Leon Leroy, and Belgian trumpeter Adolphe Dubois, to New York in 1905 to play in his New York Symphony Orchestra. Damrosch was fined by the musicians' union for not advertising for musicians from New York, but the emigrating musicians were allowed to stay. In 1906 Tabuteau returned to France to complete his three years of compulsory military service as a French citizen, and served as a military musician in the regimental band of the 45th Infantry Regiment in Compiègne. A French law that had been enacted on July 11, 1892, gave special consideration to graduates of the Conservatoire, allowing him to be demobilized after just one year of service. He returned to the United States in 1907 and the union again tried to have him expelled, on the grounds that there had been a break in his US residence since filing his first citizenship papers. The union was unsuccessful and Tabuteau became a US citizen in 1912.

Tabuteau served as principal oboist of the Philadelphia Orchestra from 1915 to 1954 under Leopold Stokowski and Eugene Ormandy, and just as importantly, taught in Philadelphia at the Curtis Institute of Music. There his classes included Oboe, Woodwind and String Ensembles, Orchestral Winds/Percussion Class, and combined ensembles. He taught at Curtis from 1925 until his retirement in 1954.

== Legacy ==
During the thirty years Tabuteau taught at the Curtis Institute of Music, he came to exercise a decisive influence on the standards of oboe playing in the whole United States, as well as raising the level of woodwind achievement in general. The impact of his teaching was not confined to wind instruments alone, as is evidenced by the many string players and pianists who attended his classes.
