= Besozzi =

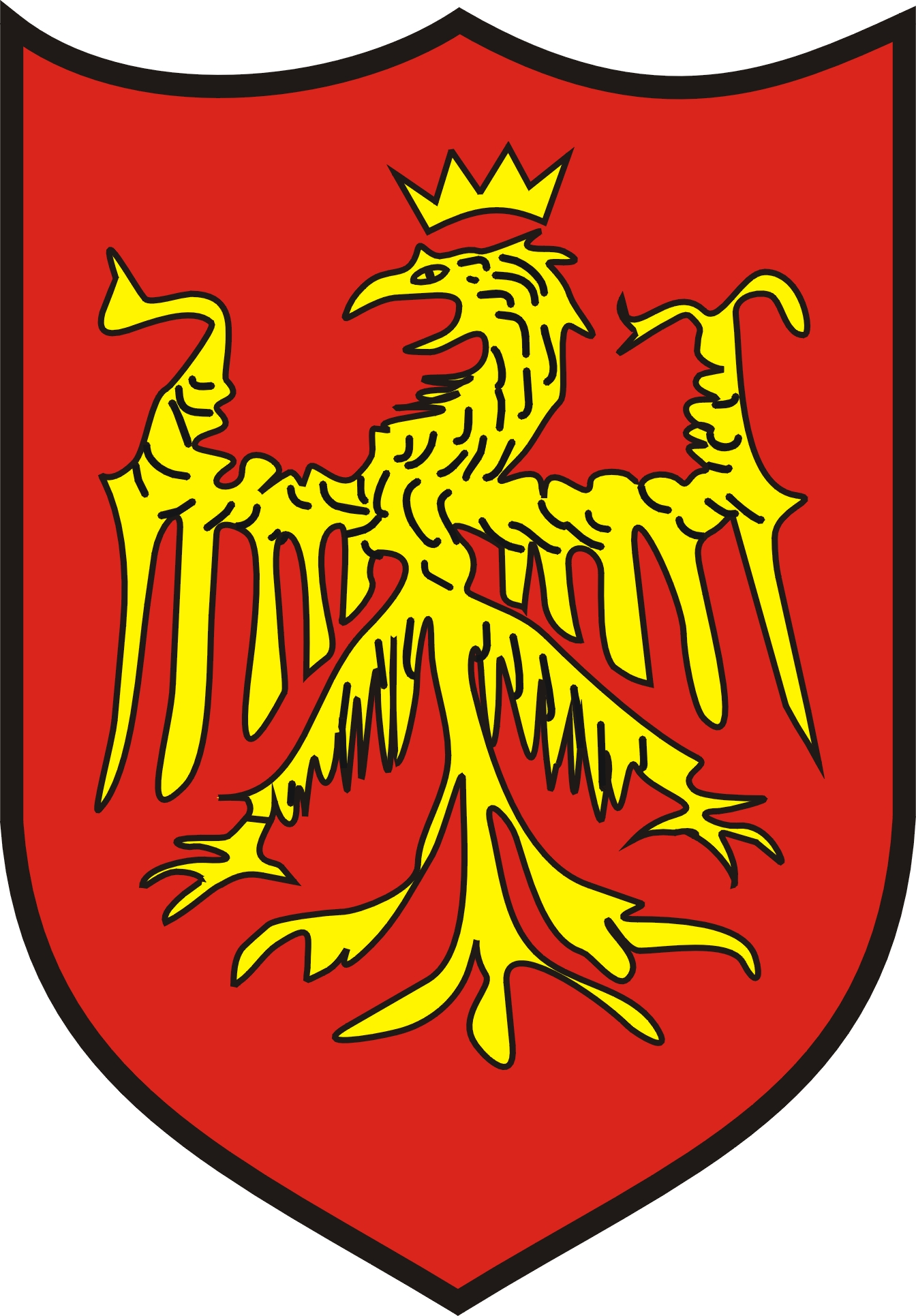
- Country: Duchy of Milan
- Titles: Count of Cormanno; Baron of the Holy Roman Empire

Besozzi is the surname of an ancient and noble family of Western Insubria still present in Lombardy and Ticino, with dozens of family branches. The name originates from the town of Besozzo, home to their castle.

- Ambrogio Besozzi (1648–1706), Italian painter
- Lucas Besozzi (born 2003), Argentine footballer
- Nino Besozzi (1901–1971), Italian actor
- Tommaso Besozzi (1903–1964), Italian journalist and writer

Members of the large Besozzi family of musicians

- Alessandro Besozzi (1702–1773), Italian oboist and composer
- Antonio Besozzi (1714–1781), Italian oboist and composer
- Carlo Besozzi (1738–1791), Italian oboist and composer
- Cristoforo Besozzi (1661–1725), Italian oboist and bassoonist
- Francesco Besozzi (1766–1816), Italian oboist
- Gaetano Besozzi (1725–1798), Italian oboist and composer
- Girolamo Besozzi (1745 or 1750–1788), Italian oboist and composer
- Giuseppe Besozzi (1686–1760), Italian oboist
- Henri Besozzi (1775-?), Italian flutist
- Louis Désiré Besozzi (1814–1879), French oboist and composer
- Paolo Girolamo Besozzi (1713–1778), Italian bassoonist, oboist and composer
