= Alessandro Besozzi =

Italian composer (1702–1793)

Alessandro Besozzi (born 22 July 1702 in Parma – died 26 July 1793 in Turin) was an Italian composer and virtuoso oboist. (Note: From a letter dated 30 July 1777 written by Quirino Gasparini, maestro di cappella of the cathedral of Turin, sent to Father Martini who had then asked for Alessandro and Paolo's "portraits made in their youth", the dates of death of Alexander and Paolo Girolamo can be fixed. Paolo was still living around 1777, while Alessandro had died in 1773.) He was a member of the ducal Guardia Irlandese from 1714, a hautboy band created by Antonio Farnese, Duke of Parma in 1702, where he worked with his father Cristoforo Besozzi and his brothers Giuseppe and Paolo Girolamo Besozzi. (Note: His file in the company reads: "Alessandro, oboist, son of Cristoforo Besozzi, Parmigiano, 12 years, blue eyes, chestnut hair, employed from 15 January 1714 with payment of 44 lire." In January 1728 listed as virtuouso di S.A.S. with payment of "three loaves of bread a day and four cups of wine, with a decent portion of wood for the winter, rented house and monthly salary of one hundred lire.") After leaving the company on 20 April 1731, he worked in Turin with his brother Paolo Girolamo at the court of Charles Emmanuel III of Sardinia.

The uncle of Antonio Besozzi and Gaetano Besozzi, he played concerts in various European cities with his younger brother Paolo. They went to Paris to play in the Concert Spirituel from 30 March to 29 May 1735, taking part for a time in the musical chapel of Versailles. He also gave singing lessons, met many important personalities of the musical world throughout Europe, (Note: Alessandro and his brother Paolo Girolamo, "the melodious brothers", as Charles Burney called them, were also famous in a collection of paintings which included works by Ludovico Carracci. Alessandro was also portrayed in Turin by Charles-André van Loo between 1732 and 1734.) and had many students who became successful musicians themselves like Johann Christian Fischer and Georg Druschetzky.

== Works ==
Alessandro Besozzi is the author of nearly two hundred chamber works composed for various groups of instruments, although only one of them was published in his lifetime. He wrote over a hundred sonatas, 65 trios, six oboe concertos, two for flute, and twelve trio sonatas.

- 6 Trio sonatas for flute, viola with basso continuo for harp or cello (London, 1747)
- 12 Sonatas for two oboes (composed together with his brother Paolo Girolamo)
- 6 pieces for flute, oboe and viola, Op. 2 (Paris, 1740)
- 6 sonatas for 2 violas and basso continuo for harp, Op. 4 (London, 1760)
- 6 sonatas for 2 violas or 2 flutes with basso continuo, Op. 5 (London, 1764)
- 6 Suonate mises au jour per Canavasse
- 6 sonatas for viola solo and basso continuo
- 12 Trios for 2 transverse flutes and harpsichord
- Sonata a 2 for oboe and basso
- Trii delli Sig.ri Fratelli Besuzzi di Torino for 2 flutes con basso
- Sonata a tre for transverse flute, viola and basso
- 8 Sonatas for 2 violas and cello
- Trio for 2 violas with basso
- 6 Trios for 2 violas and cello
- Sonata da camera for 2 violas and basso
- 6 Sonatas for 2 violas and basso
- Canzonette for soprano with basso
- Sonata a tre for 2 violas and basso
- Trio for 2 transverse flutes or viola and basso
- 2 Sonata da camera
- 6 Trios for 2 violas or oboe instead of the first violin and basso
- Sonata in B-flat major for trombone and piano
- 6 pieces for flute, oboe or viola, with basso continuo for harp or cello, Op. 3 (London, 1750)
