= Gaetano Besozzi =

Italian oboist and composer

Gaetano François Marie Besozzi (born 25 March 1727 in Piacenza – 15 Nivôse XII - 6 January 1804 - in Versailles) was an Italian oboist and composer. Son of Giuseppe Besozzi, brother of Antonio Besozzi and nephew of Alessandro Besozzi, he became an oboist in the court of Naples from 1740, and from 1765 at the court of the King of France in Paris and Versailles. Between 1768 and 1788, he played in the Concert Spirituel and the salons of Paris. His performances were applauded by every audience and deemed in high esteem by musicologist Charles Burney.

In 1778, he received a pension from the French king. Before the outbreak of the French Revolution in 1793, he fled to London, where he worked until his death. Besozzi emerged as a composer of chamber music works. His son Girolamo Besozzi, father of Henri Besozzi and grandfather of the composer Louis Désiré Besozzi, was also a musician.
