= Louis Désiré Besozzi =

French pianist, organist and composer

Louis-Désiré Besozzi (3 April 1814 – 11 November 1879) was a French pianist, organist and composer. Bezozzi, the fourth generation of this traditional family of wind instrument musicians, composed mainly piano and choral works as well as a four-volume work with exercises for choral singing.

== Biography ==
Born in Versailles, Louis Besozzi belonged a family of artists from Italy, many of them with a reputation of being instrumental in Turin, Naples and Dresden. His great-great grandfather Giuseppe Besozzi was an oboist in Parma, his great-grandfather Gaetano Besozzi oboist at the court of Naples and later in the chapel of Versailles, his grandfather Girolamo Besozzi oboist in the service of the King of France and his father Henri Besozzi flutist at the Opéra-Comique. He entered the Conservatoire de Paris on 18 July 1825 as a pupil of Auguste Barbereau (piano) and Jean-François Lesueur (composition).

From 1831 he worked at the Conservatory as successor of Ferdinand Gasse in solfège and later as piano teacher at the École de musique classique et religieuse of Louis Niedermeyer, where he was succeeded by Camille Saint-Saëns in 1865. Many times a prize winner at the Conservatory, he won the 1837 Grand Prix de Rome and went on to study at the French Academy in Rome, where he met Jean-Auguste-Dominique Ingres, Charles Gounod, Dominique Papety and others. Later he devoted his life to teaching popular music and the development of orfeónic societies, for which he wrote his Solfèges, des exercices et des méthodes d'apprentissage.

In 1852, Besozzi succeeded Louis Braille on the Cavaillé-Coll organ, built in 1845 in the Church of St. Vincent de Paul. He had attended the inaugural ceremony for this great organ on 26 January 1852, but his career as organist remained unsuccessful. After several candidates, Johann Peter Cavallo was selected.

Besozzi died in Paris.

== Selected works ==
- 12 Études caractéristiques, Op. 19
- L'Hymne du Matin
