= Territorial evolution of Switzerland =

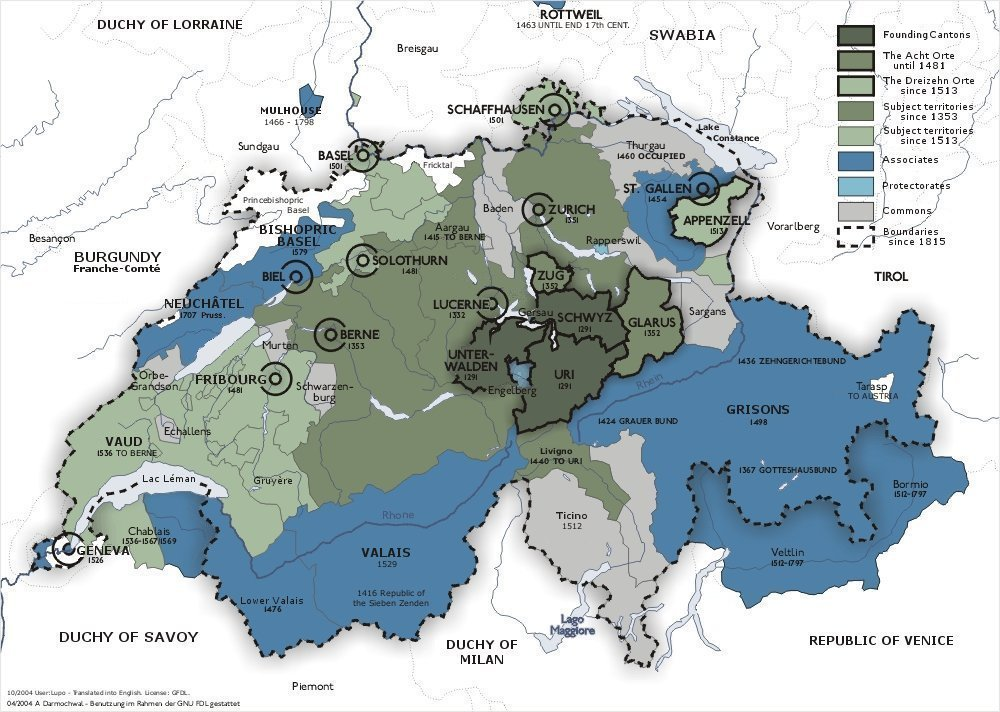
Map of the territorial evolution of the Old Swiss Confederacy (1291–1798).

The territorial evolution of Switzerland occurred primarily with the acquisition of territory by the historical cantons of the Old Swiss Confederacy and its close associates. This gradual expansion took place in two phases, the growth from the medieval Founding Cantons to the "Eight Cantons" during 1332–1353, and the expansion to the "Thirteen Cantons" of the Reformation period during 1481–1513.

The Helvetic Republic (formed 1798) as revised in the Act of Mediation (1803) added further territories of former Associates of the Swiss Confederacy, notably those of the Abbey of St. Gall and the Three Leagues. The territories of the Valais, the Swiss Jura and Geneva were added to the "restored" Confederacy following the Congress of Vienna in 1815.

The restored Confederacy remained a union of nominally independent states until the formation of Switzerland as a federal state in 1848. Some territorial disputes remained, and were resolved in the 1850s and 1860s. Since then, the territory of Switzerland has remained fixed (with the exception of minor border corrections) by 1863.

There have since been a number of unsuccessful suggestions for further enlargement. The most realistic of these was the possible accession of Vorarlberg following a referendum held there in 1919, in which 81% of the people of Vorarlberg voted to join Switzerland; but Vorarlberg was instead incorporated into the First Austrian Republic. There was a brief and unsuccessful revival of Alemannic separatism after World War II, and in the later half of the 20th century, there were no serious political scenarios of any further enlargement of Switzerland.

Since there is currently no legal framework governing the admission of new cantons, any enlargement would, as a matter of Swiss law, require an amendment of the Swiss federal constitution and therefore a national popular referendum. A corresponding proposal was submitted by Jurassian representative Dominique Baettig in 2010, but was dropped after Baettig was not re-elected in 2011.

== Old Swiss Confederacy ==
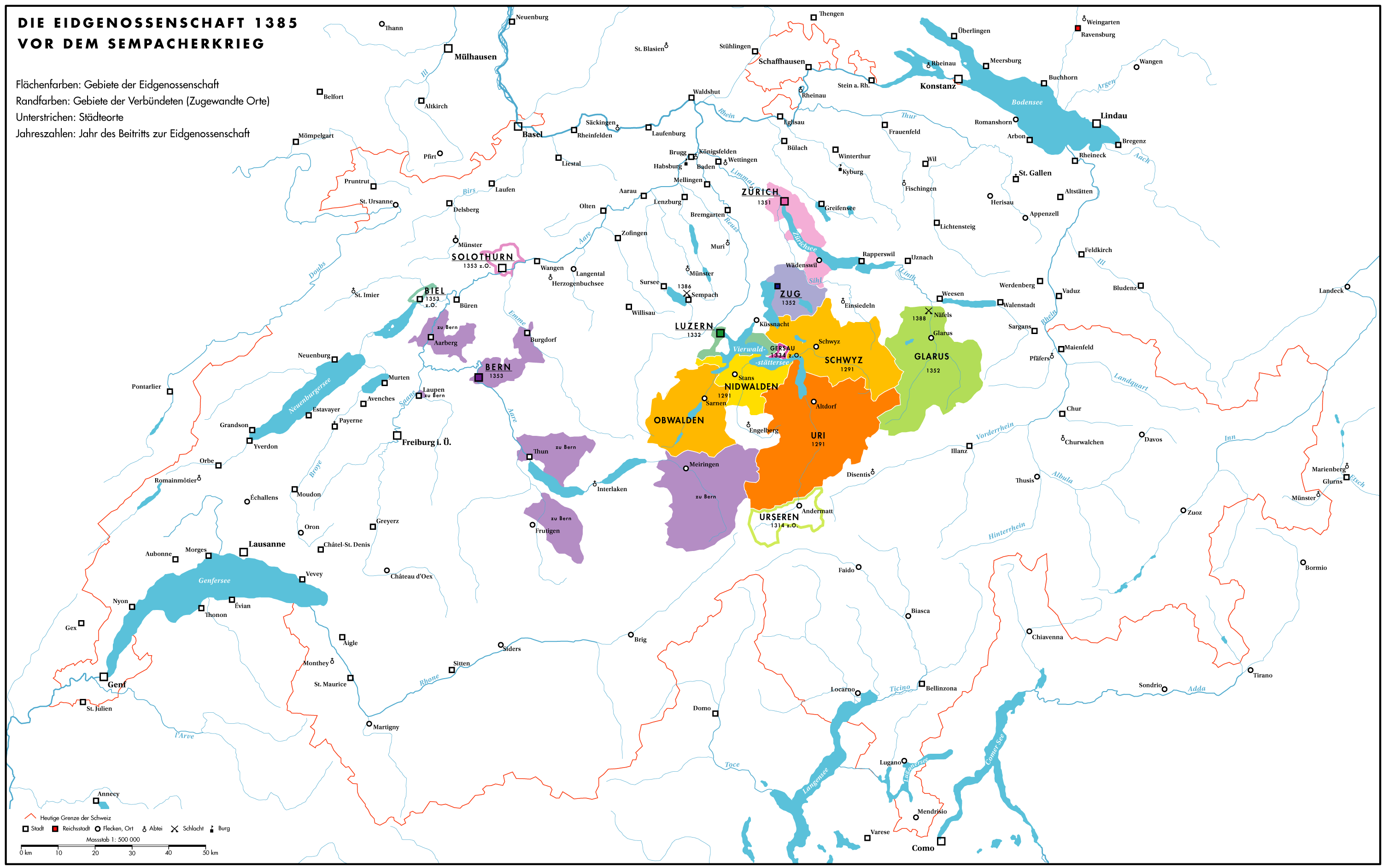
Map of the Old Swiss Confederacy (Acht Orte) in 1385.

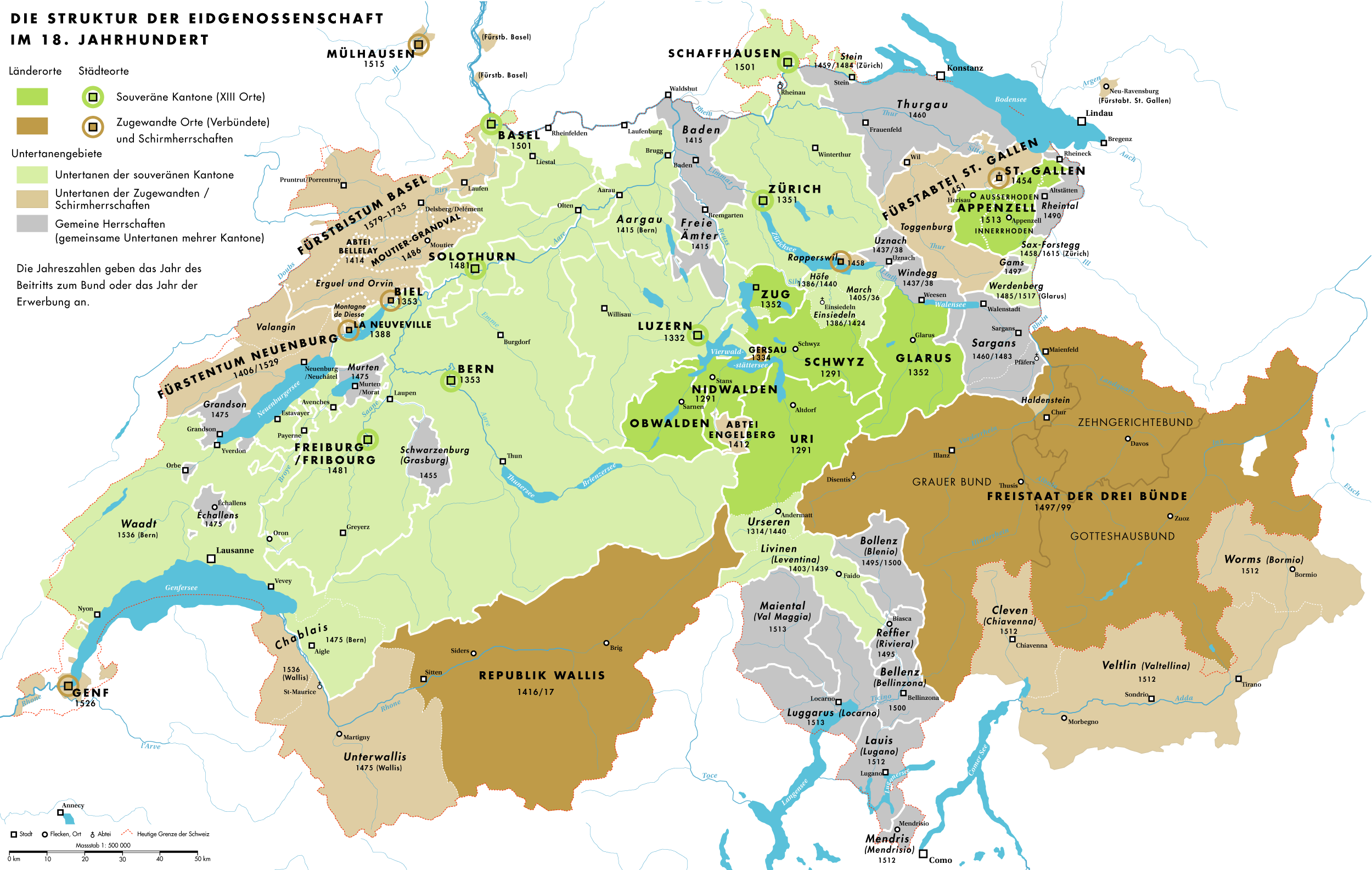
Map of the Old Swiss Confederacy (Dreizehn Orte) in the 18th century

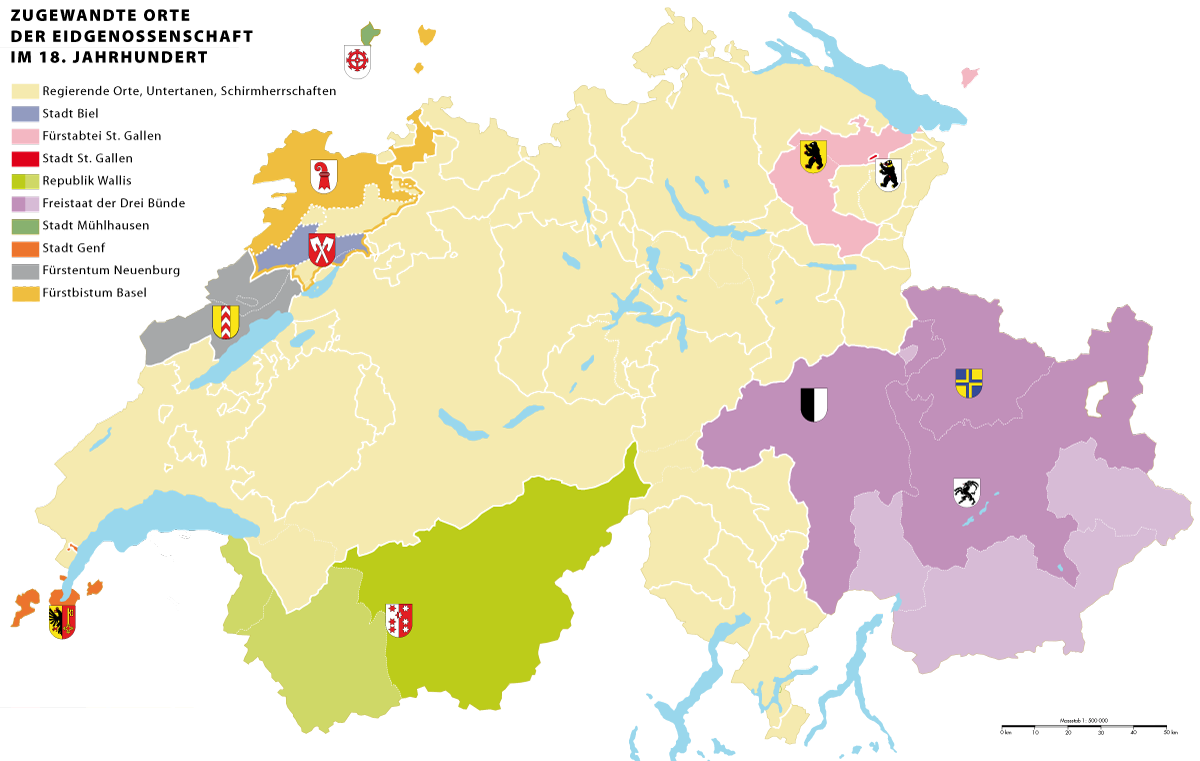
Zugewante Orte (Associated States) of the Old Swiss Confederacy in the 18th century

Switzerland, a multilingual federation of 26 cantons whose origins lie in a defensive alliance of alpine valleys around the end of the 13th century, grew through the accession of new states and territories during the 14th to 16th centuries. The accession of Appenzell in 1513 completed the growth of the Confederacy into the Thirteen Cantons of the early modern period. The Valais became an "eternal associate" of the Confederacy in 1529. In 1536 the Swiss canton of Bern annexed the Vaud from Savoy.

Geneva had sought alliances with the Swiss Confederacy (in order to defend itself against Savoy) since the early 16th century. The conclusion of an eternal treaty with the Protestant cantons Bern and Zürich in 1584 tied Geneva closely to Switzerland, but the Catholic cantons, which had allied themselves with the dukes of Savoy since 1560, opposed the full accession of Geneva as a member of the Confederacy.

In addition to the cantons, the Old Swiss Confederacy had several associated states (Zugewandte Orte), which included the Sieben Zenden (Valais), the Three Leagues (principally present-day Graubünden), and the Imperial Abbey of St. Gall.

== Napoleonic era, Restoration and Regeneration ==
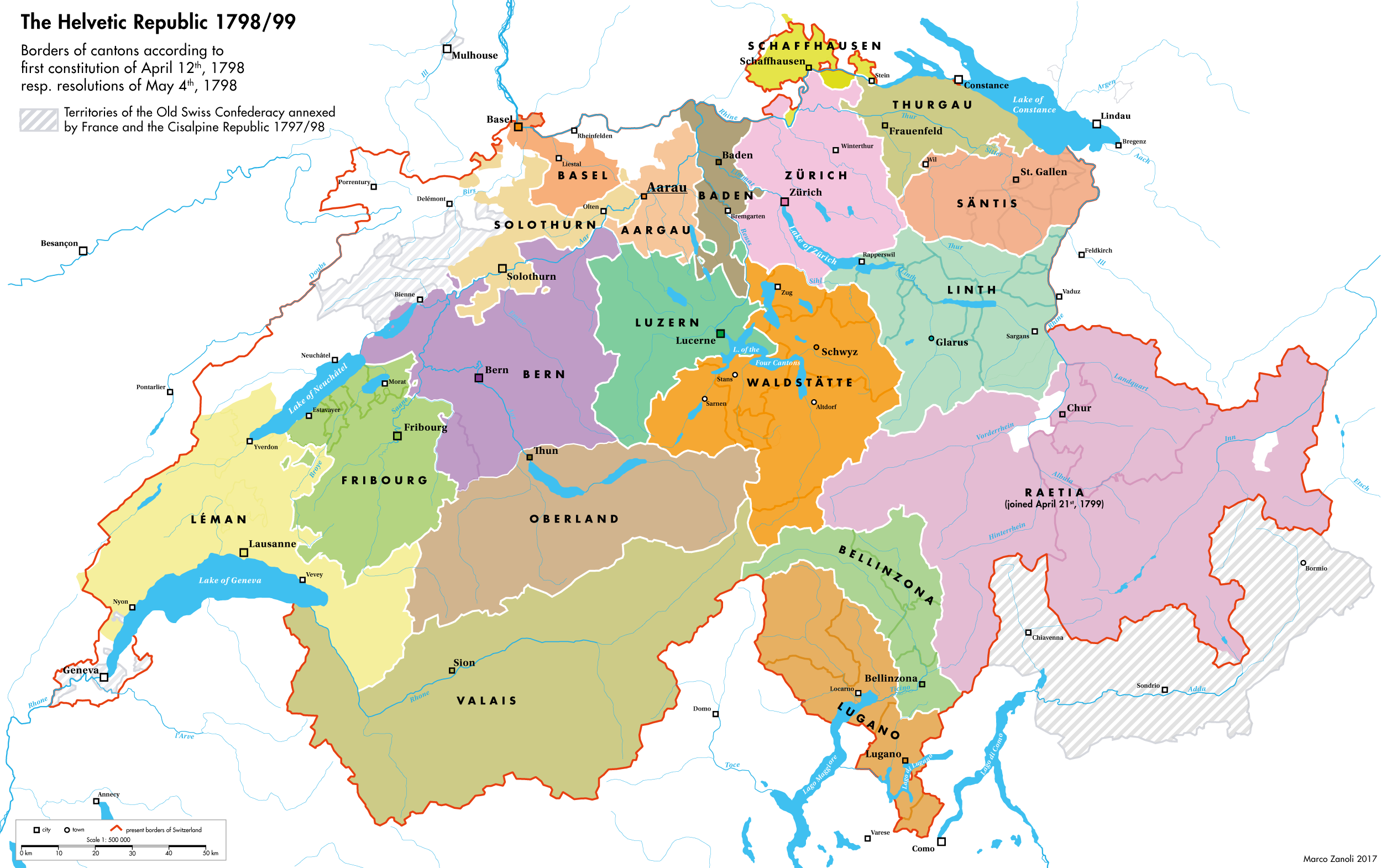
Map of the Helvetic Republic (1798)

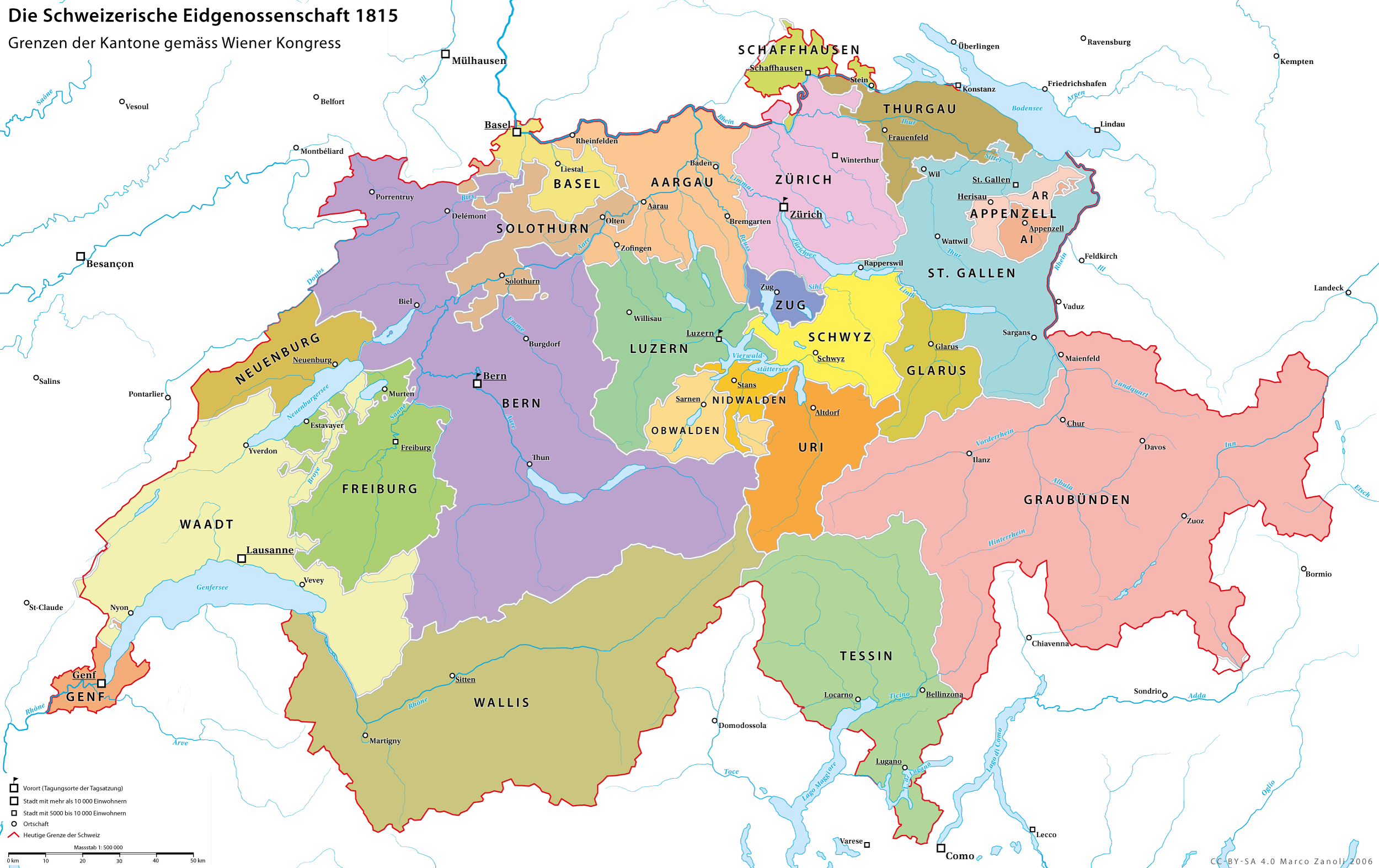
Map of Switzerland in 1815

New cantons were added only in the modern period, during 1803–1815; this mostly concerned former subject territories now recognized as full cantons (such as Vaud, Ticino and Aargau), and the full integration of territories that had been more loosely allied to the Confederacy (such as Geneva, Valais and Grisons).

Grisons acceded with the Act of Mediation in 1803. At that time, the territory of Tarasp, formerly an exclave within the territory of the League of God's House, was ceded by Austria. Similarly, the newly created canton of Aargau included the territory of Fricktal, which had previously remained as the only territory left of the Rhine under direct Habsburg control. The Canton of St. Gallen was created at the same time, out of a number of disparate territories, which had however all been previously either allied with or subject to Swiss cantons.

The territory of Geneva was fragmented, with various enclaves or exclaves of Savoyard and French territory, and it was not connected to Swiss territory. Due to the efforts of Charles Pictet de Rochemont, the Congress of Vienna decided to incorporate seven communes of the French Pays de Gex in order to create a land bridge between Geneva and Switzerland.

The Valtellina had been a territory of the Three Leagues from the 15th century until 1797, when it was annexed by the Cisalpine Republic. The Congress of Vienna considered restoring the Valtellina to Grisons, and thus to Switzerland, but the strategic importance of the territory was deemed as too high by Austria, and it became part of the Kingdom of Lombardy–Venetia instead. The loss of the Valtellina remained an irredentist issue in Grisons well into the 20th century.

Along with the Valtellina, Chiavenna was lost to the Cisalpine Republic in 1797, and the Congress of Vienna likewise declined its restoration to Switzerland. While Switzerland accepted the loss of Chiavenna itself, the Valle di Lei north of Chiavenna was indicated as Swiss territory on the Dufour map of 1858. It was only in 1863 that Switzerland reached an understanding with the Kingdom of Italy on the exact definition of the Swiss-Italian border.

The Congress of Vienna distributed the remaining territory of the Prince-Bishopric of Basel (intermittently annexed by France) to Bern and Basel.

The commune of Le Cerneux-Péquignot had been part the Franche-Comté and as such of the kingdom of France since 1678. It was to be ceded to Neuchâtel according to the treaty of Paris of 30 May 1814, but the necessary border correction did not become official until 1 February 1819. Similarly, Rhäzüns was restored from Austria to Switzerland on 19 January 1819.

Switzerland in 1815 was still a confederacy, not a fully integrated federation. The canton of Neuchâtel joined in 1815 as a member of the confederacy but was at the same time a monarchy, its sovereign being Frederick William IV of Prussia. Although Neuchâtel became a republic in a peaceful revolution in 1848, the same year Switzerland became a federation, Frederick William renounced his claims in the area in 1857, after several attempts at counterrevolution culminating in the Neuchâtel Crisis.

A number of territorial disputes remained along the German-Swiss border, especially concerning the territories of Thurgau and Schaffhausen. The status of Tägermoos was settled in 1831, the precise borders of Schaffhausen in 1839, and the final remaining questions by 1854.

When Ticino chose to become part of the Swiss Confederation in 1798, the people of the Italian exclave Campione d'Italia chose to remain part of Lombardy. In 1800, Ticino proposed exchanging Indemini for Campione. In 1814 a referendum was held, but the residents of Campione were against it. In 1848, during the wars of Italian unification, Campione petitioned Switzerland for annexation, but this was rejected due to the Swiss desire to maintain neutrality.

== Modern Switzerland (1848–present) ==
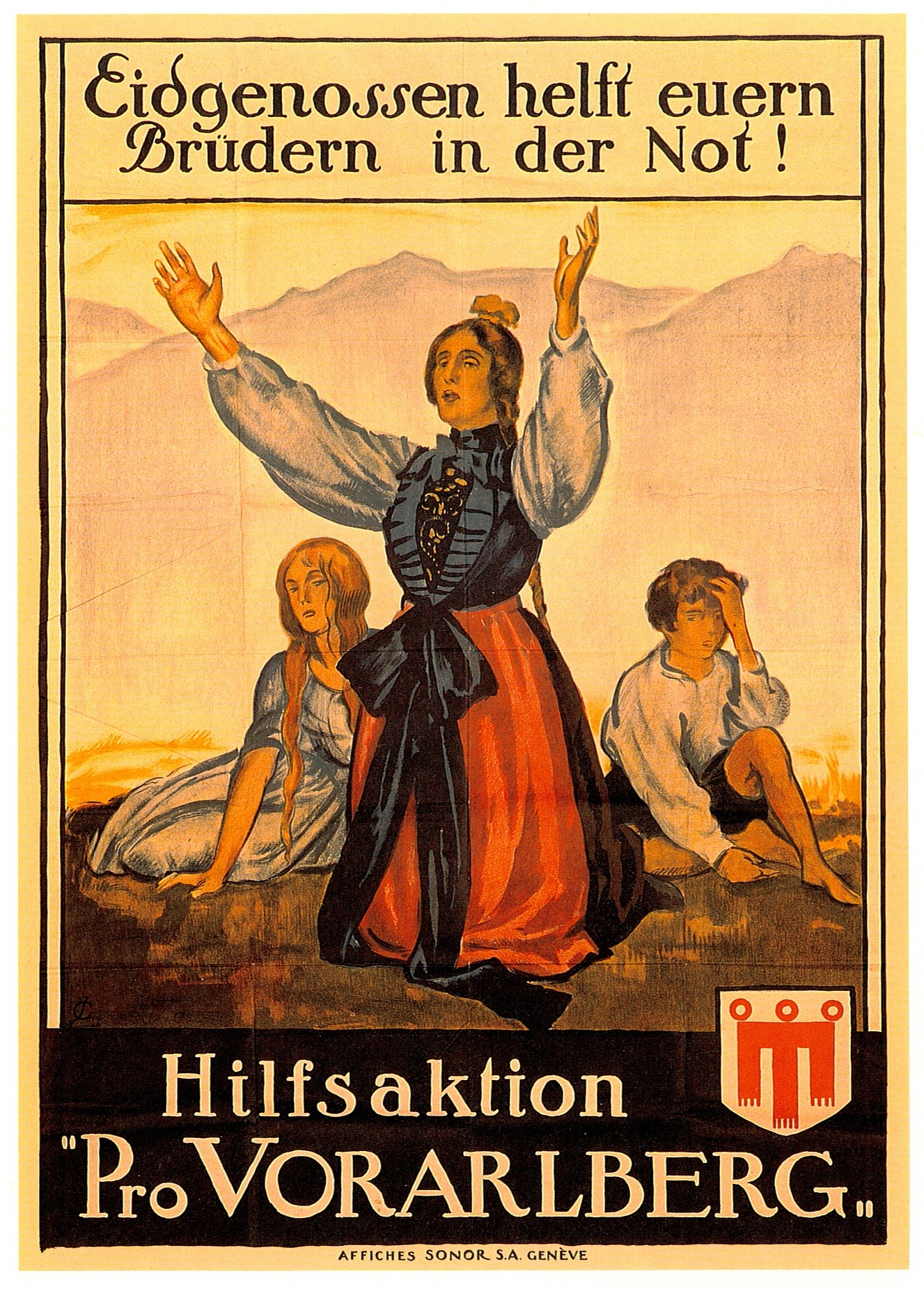
"Confederates, help your brothers in need!" Swiss poster of the Pro Vorarlberg movement advocating for an accession of Vorarlberg, 1919.

After Italian unification in 1861, all land west of Lake Lugano and half of the lake were given to Switzerland so that Swiss trade and transport would not have to pass through Italy. The d'Italia suffix was added to the name of Campione in the 1930s by Prime Minister Benito Mussolini and an ornamental gate to the city was built, both in an attempt to assert the exclave's Italian-ness.

There remained some territorial disputes after the formation of the Kingdom of Italy, resolved in the Convenzione tra l'Italia e la Svizzera per l'accertamento della frontiera fra la Lombardia ed il Cantone dei Grigioni of 1863. Since then, the international borders of Switzerland have been undisputed and, except for minor corrections, unchanged (the internal borders of the cantons of Switzerland have been subject to revision, mostly in the context of the Jura question). Further Swiss-Italian treaties regarding the course of the border date to 1873/4, 1936/7 and 1941.

The part of the Chablais region south of Lake Geneva was ceded to the Kingdom of Sardinia by the Congress of Vienna, but declared a demilitarized zone, and Switzerland was granted the right to occupy both Chablais and Faucigny for its own protection in the case of war. In 1860, when France annexed Savoy from the Kingdom of Piedmont-Sardinia, Napoleon III declared his intention to cede Chablais and Faucigny to Switzerland, but later reneged on the promise. The Swiss authorities were themselves ambivalent on the matter, as they feared the destabilising effect the annexation of two Catholic provinces might have on interfaith relations within the country. But popular opinion in Switzerland was outraged at Napoleon's breach of promise. Switzerland increased its military presence at the southern border to prevent clashes between Savoyard and Swiss irregulars. The crisis subsided gradually as it became clear that Napoleon adhered to the promise of neutrality for Haute-Savoie renewed in the Treaty of Turin of 24 March 1860. But Switzerland did not recognize the annexation of Savoy, and the status of Chablais was brought before the Permanent Court of International Justice several times between 1922 and 1932.

In 1918 after the First World War, a referendum was held in the small exclave Büsingen am Hochrhein in Baden-Württemberg in which 96% of voters chose to become part of Switzerland. However the change of country never took place as Switzerland could not offer anything suitable in exchange and consequently, Büsingen has remained an exclave of Germany ever since. Later attempts to transfer Büsingen to Switzerland were also unsuccessful. The status of the municipality of Büsingen was however formally defined in 1967 through negotiations between West Germany and Switzerland. Büsingen am Hochrhein officially became part of the Swiss customs area. It had been in a de facto customs union with Switzerland since 1947. At the same time, the West German exclave of Verenahof, consisting of just three houses and eleven West German citizens, did become part of Switzerland.

In a 1919 referendum, 81% of the people of Vorarlberg voted to join Switzerland, but the effort failed because of the ambivalent position of the Swiss government and the opposition of the Allied powers.

The Swiss government expressed willingness to consider the accession of Vorarlberg to Switzerland, mostly in order to prevent its incorporation into Germany.

Changes to the Swiss border made after 1945 include the addition of the Lago di Lei barrage to Switzerland in the 1950s, and the exchange of an area of 1,578 square meters with France in 2002.

== Proposals for expansion ==
A poll by ORF radio in October 2008 reported that about half of the population of Vorarlberg would be in favour of joining Switzerland.

In the Swiss parliament, a 2010 motion was submitted by Jurassian representative Dominique Baettig and co-signed by SVP party chairman Toni Brunner. The motion proposed to offer territories adjacent to Switzerland the "Swiss model of sovereignty" as an alternative to a "creeping accession" of Switzerland to the "centralist" European Union. As possible candidates for accession, the motion named Alsace (France), Aosta (Italy), South Tyrol (Italy), Jura (France), Vorarlberg (Austria), Ain (France), Savoy (France), Baden-Württemberg (Germany), Varese (Italy), Como (Italy) "and others". The motion was widely seen as anti-EU rhetoric rather than a serious proposal. In a statement of 19 May 2010, the Swiss Federal Council recommended its rejection, describing the motion as a "provocation". It argued that its adoption would be considered an unfriendly act by the countries surrounding Switzerland, and that it would also be at odds with international law, which in the government's view does not provide for a right to secession except in exceptional circumstances. The topic attracted the attention of the European media. The media went on to report a high level of apparent popular support for joining Switzerland in the territories in question (as reflected in Internet polls and comments):

- In Como, an online poll in June 2010 by the La Provincia di Como newspaper found 74% of 2,500 respondents in favor of accession to Switzerland, which the local regionalist party Lega Lombarda has long been advocating.
- Another online poll by the South German Südkurier newspaper found that almost 70% of respondents replied "yes, the Swiss are closer to us in outlook" to a question whether the state of Baden-Württemberg should join Switzerland. The paper noted that seldom had a topic generated so much activity by its readership.
- The Lombard eco-nationalist party Domà Nunch replied to Baettig's motion proposing an integration between Switzerland and the Italian border-area of Insubria in order to join into a new Confederation.
- The Mouvement Franche-Comté declared its support for Franche-Comté to become a Swiss Canton. Alongside the Savoie Europe Liberté, they commissioned polls in 2008 which showed support Switzerland for Franche-Comté and Savoy to join Switzerland. According to another poll from 2009 by Savoyan League, 14% would like to join Switzerland.

In Sardinia, the Associazione no-profit Sardegna Canton Marittimo was formed in April 2014 with the aim of advocating Sardinia's secession from Italy and becoming a "maritime canton" of Switzerland.

Die Welt in June 2014 based on an OECD study published an article arguing that Southern Germany is more similar to Switzerland than to Northern or Eastern Germany. In the wake of the article, there were once again reports on high levels of support for accession to Switzerland in Southern Germany. Schwäbische Zeitung reported 86% of participants in an online survey expressing approval.

Also in 2014, there were reports of a movement in South Tyrol (headed by a South Tyrolean living in Switzerland) proposing annexation by the Alpine country. The 6th "Global Forum Südtirol" held in Bolzano was dedicated to the question.

In 2017, a petition with 700 signatures was submitted to Federal Council asking Valtellina (part of the Province of Sondrio) to be accepted as a canton or as part of Grisons. Until 1797, the region was part of the Three Leagues and then became part of Italy (via the Cisalpine Republic).

In 2018, the Swiss Head of the Department of Foreign Affairs Ignazio Cassis, answering to a parliamentary question by the national councillor Marco Romano, declared as "imaginable" the transfer of the Italian exclave Campione d'Italia to the Canton of Ticino. The declaration was made a short time after the bankruptcy of the Casinò di Campione. The undersecretary of the Italian Minister of the Interior Stefano Candiani replied that Campione d'Italia is Italian territory without any doubt.

== Maps showing the territorial evolution of Switzerland ==
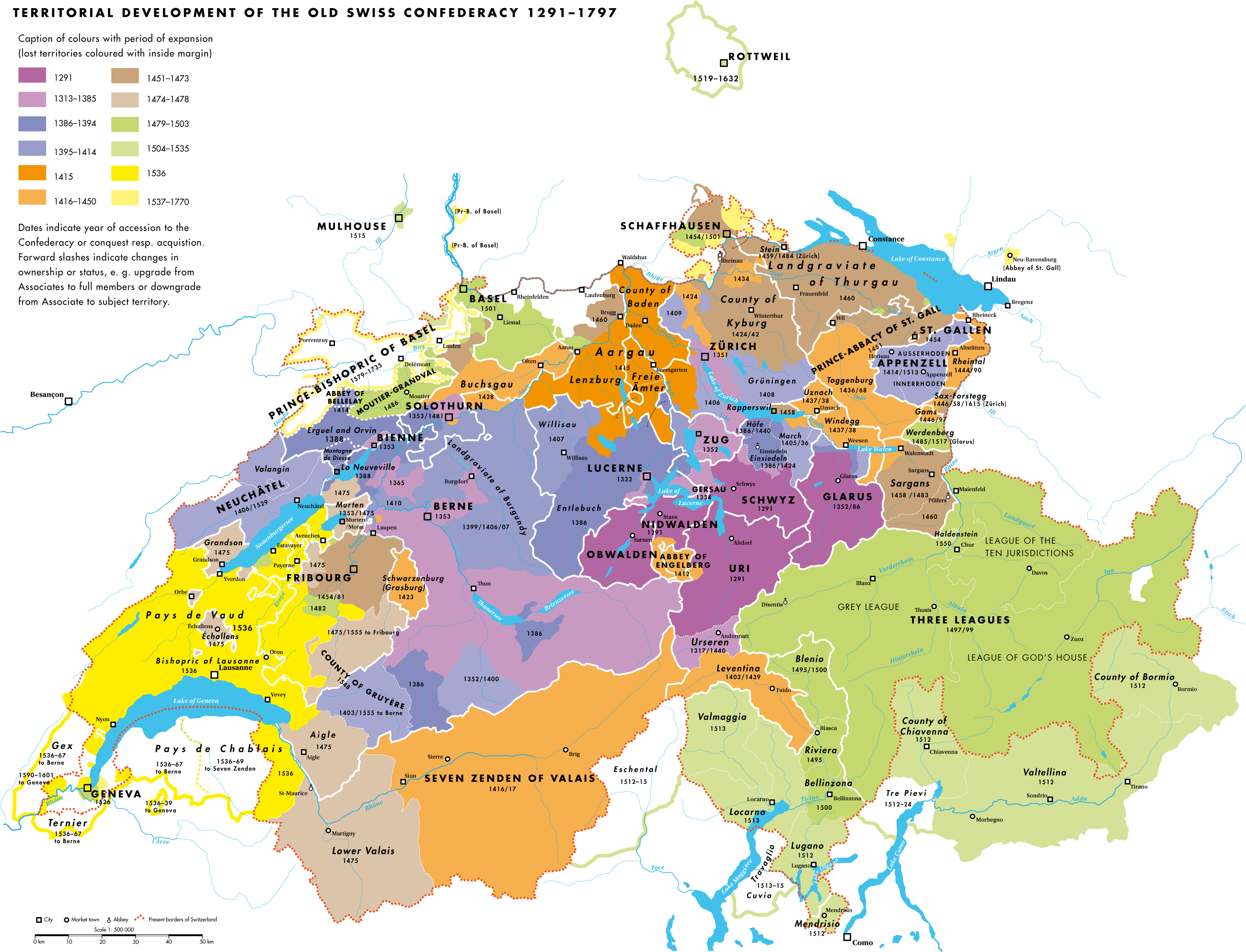
Territorial development of Old Swiss Confederacy, 1291–1797.

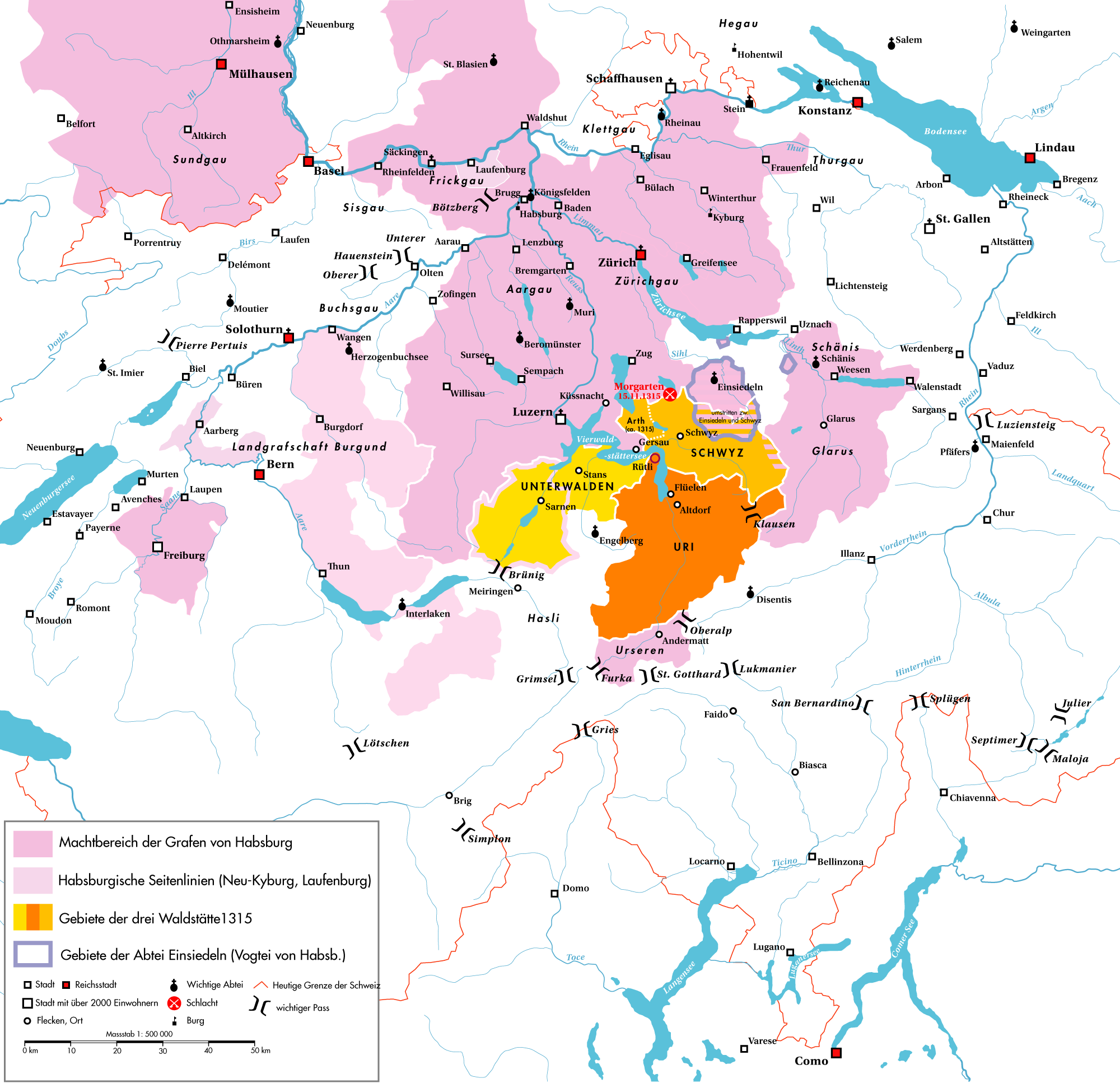
Switzerland in 1315, just before the Battle of Morgarten.

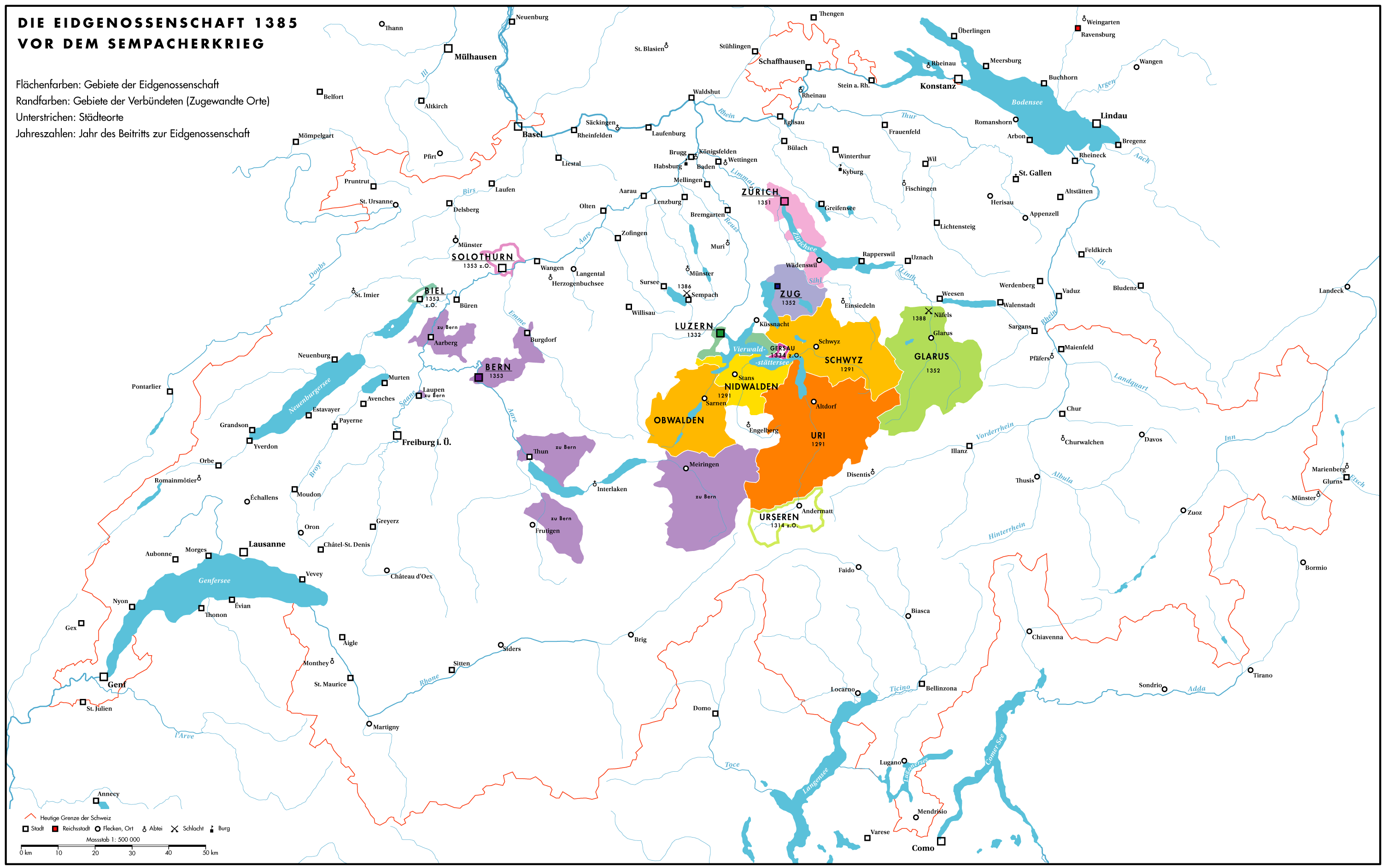
Switzerland in 1385, just before the Battle of Sempach.

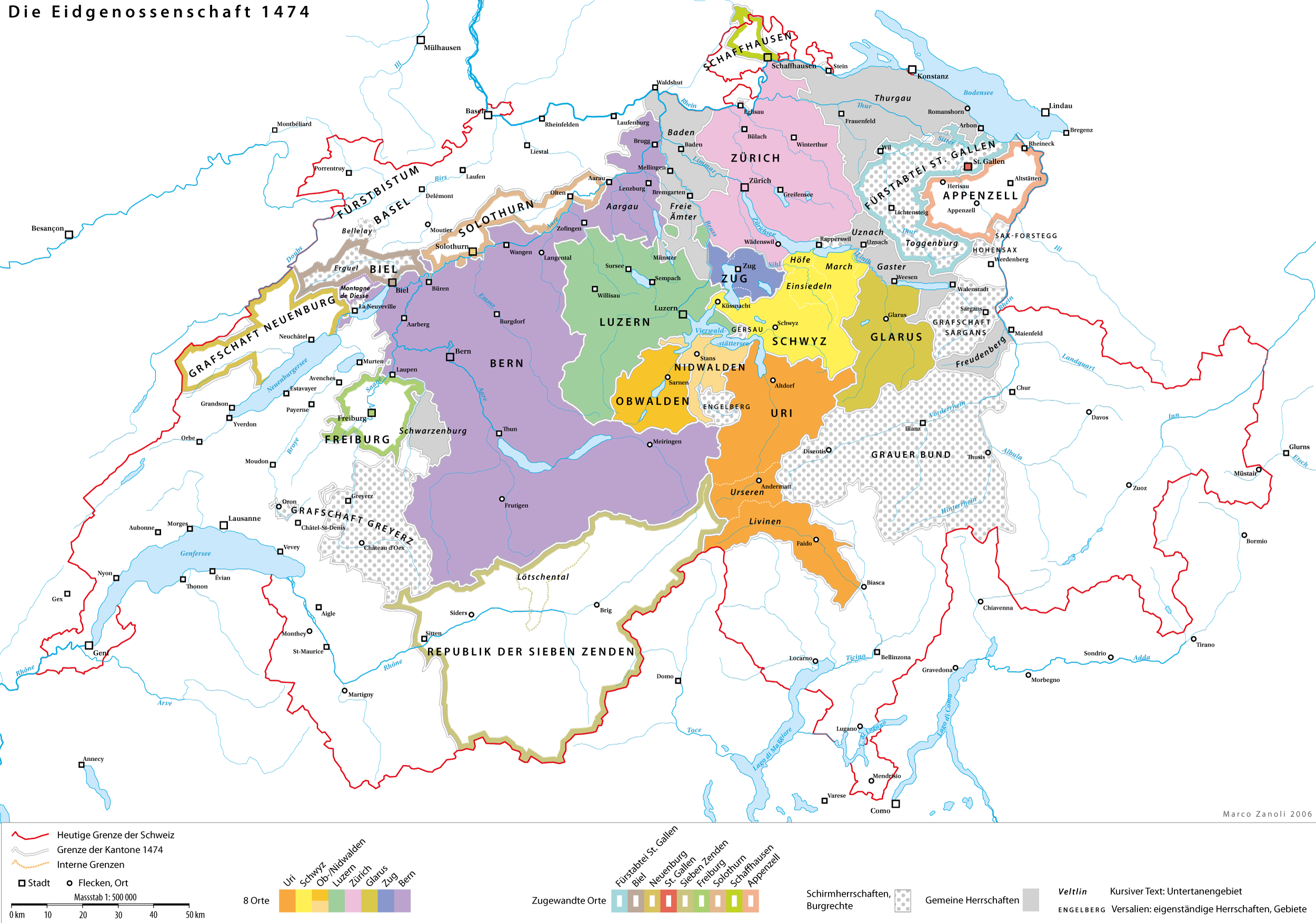
Switzerland in 1474, just before the Burgundian Wars.

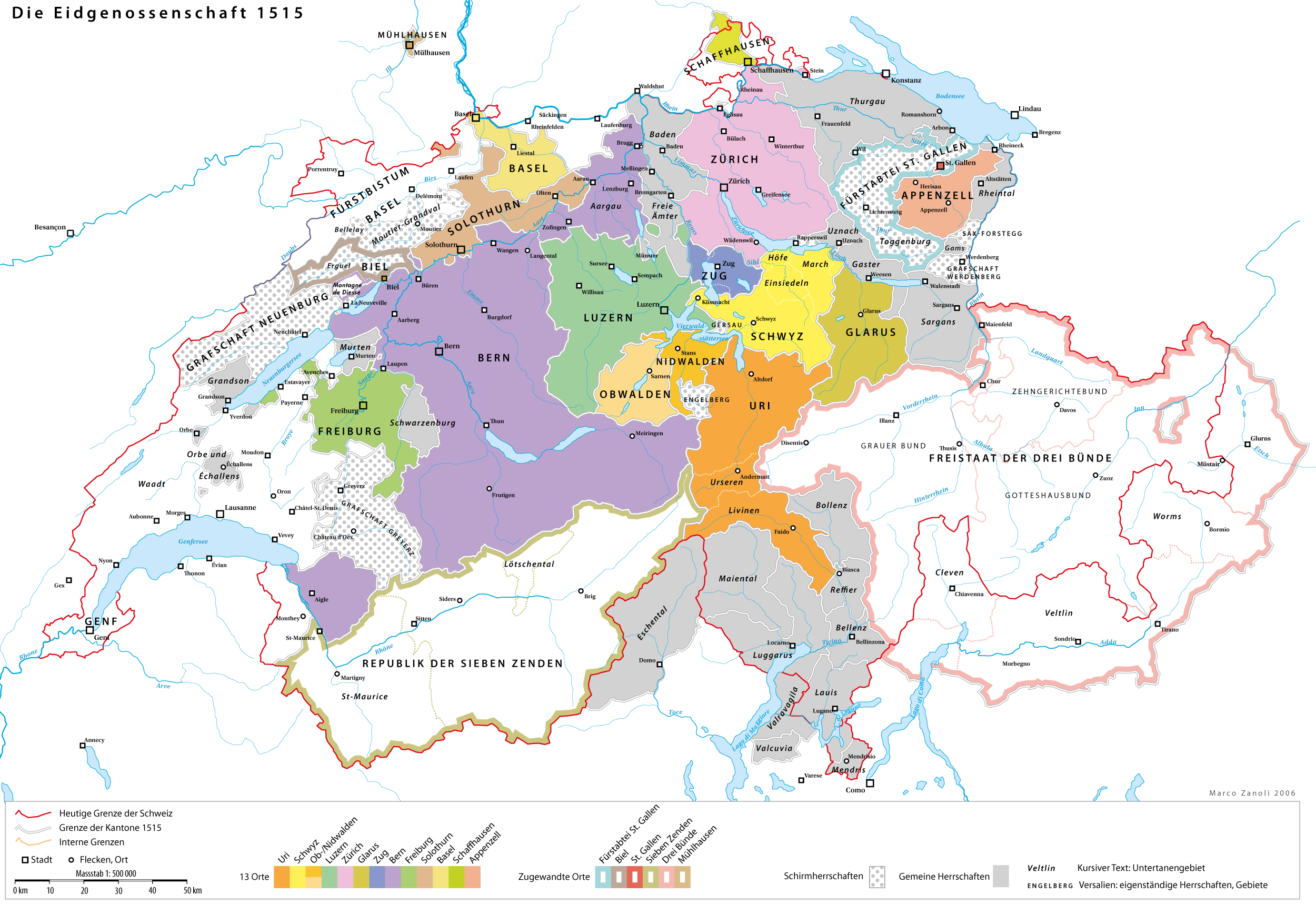
Switzerland in 1515, just before the Battle of Marignano.

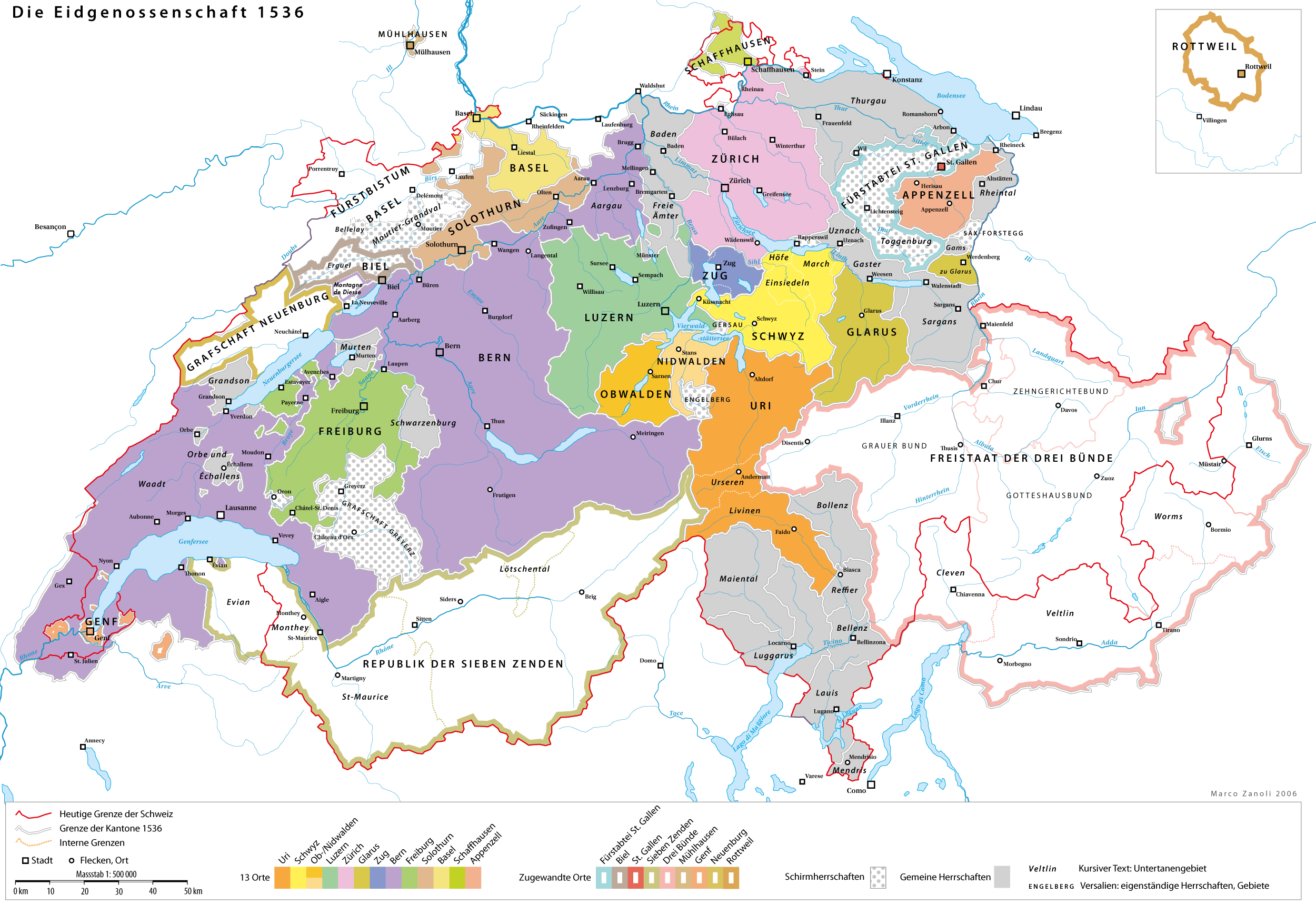
Switzerland in 1536, during the Reformation, just after the conquest of Vaud by Bern and Fribourg.

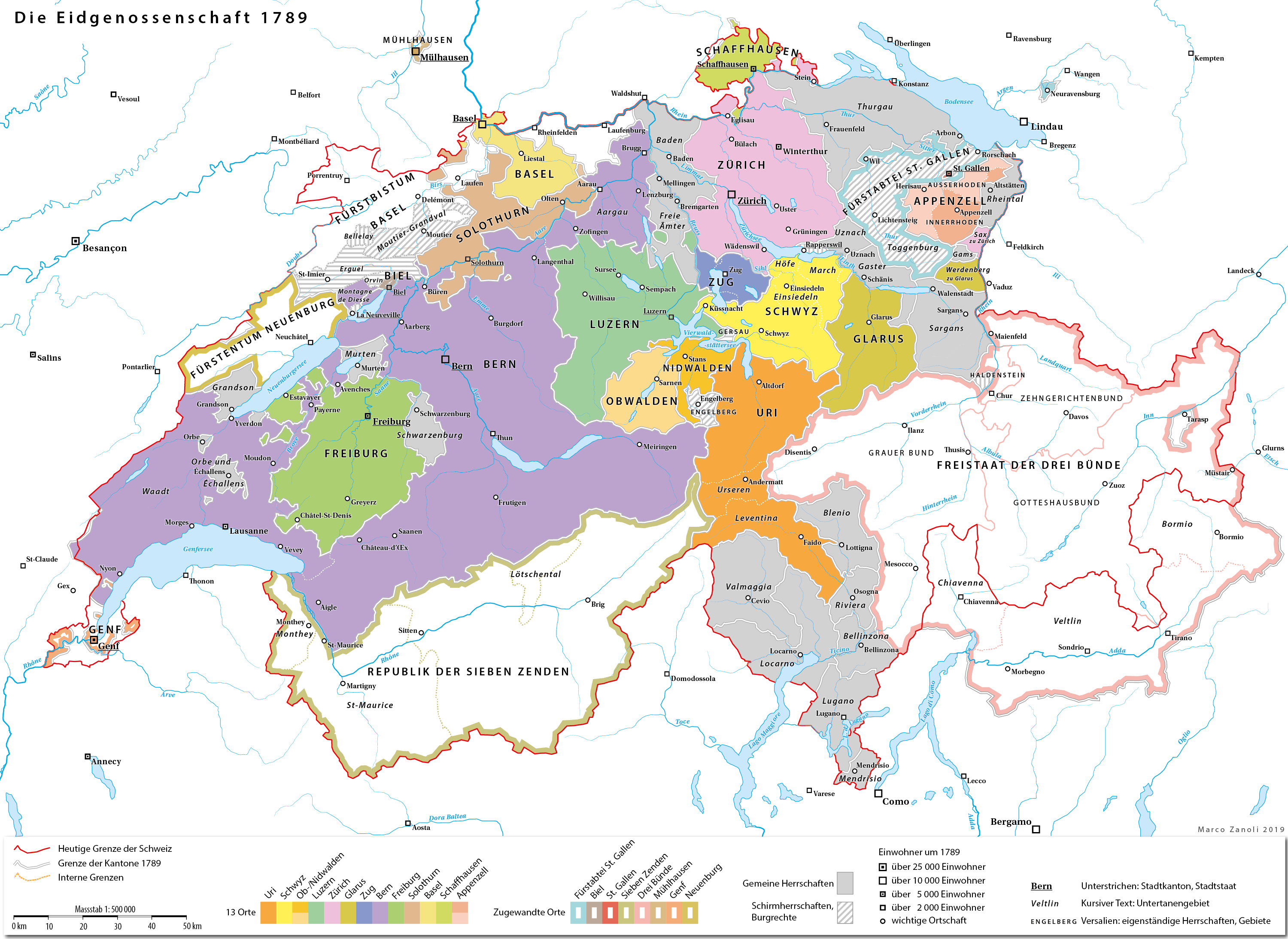
Switzerland in the 18th century.

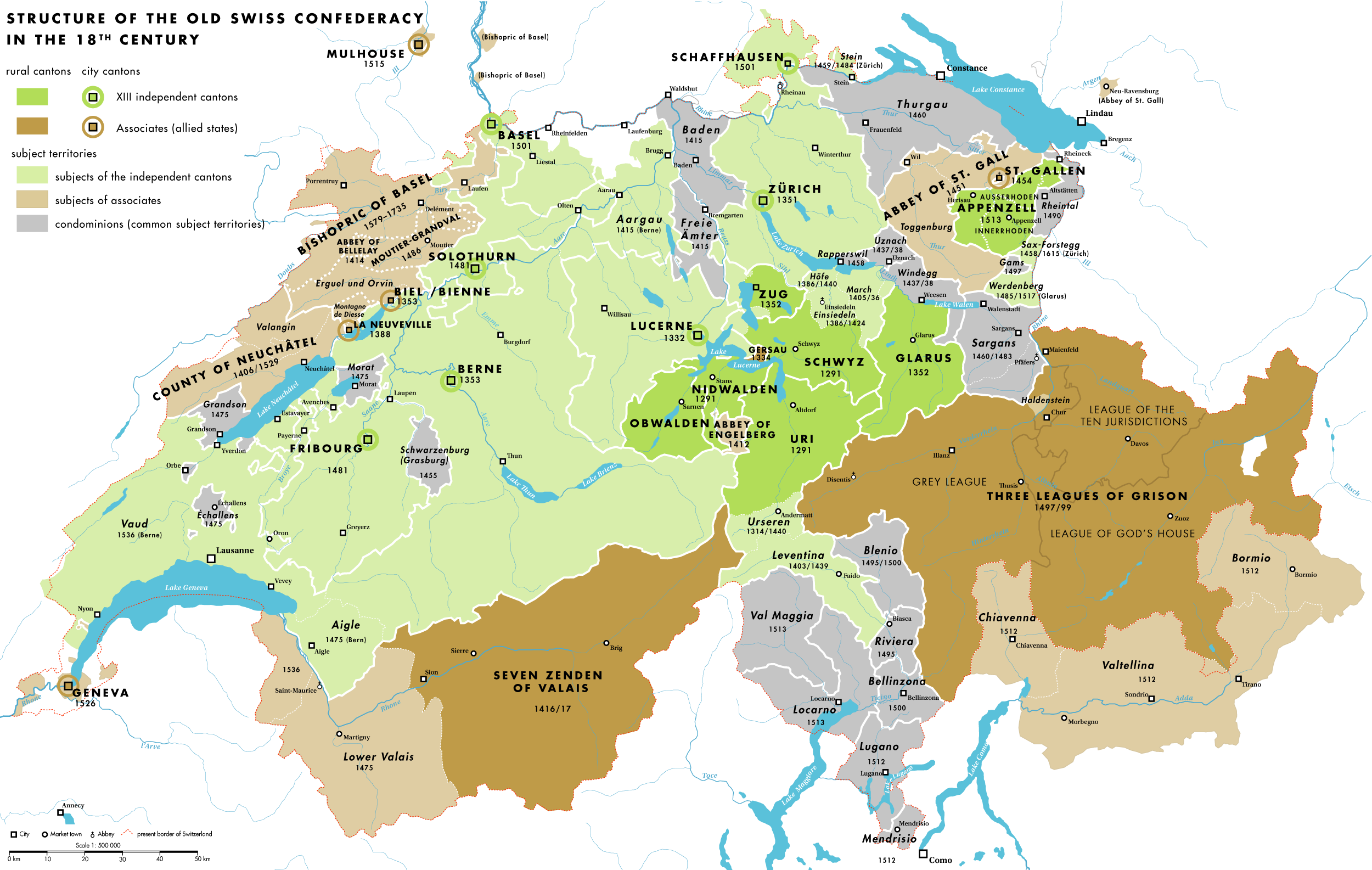
Another map of Switzerland in the 18th century.

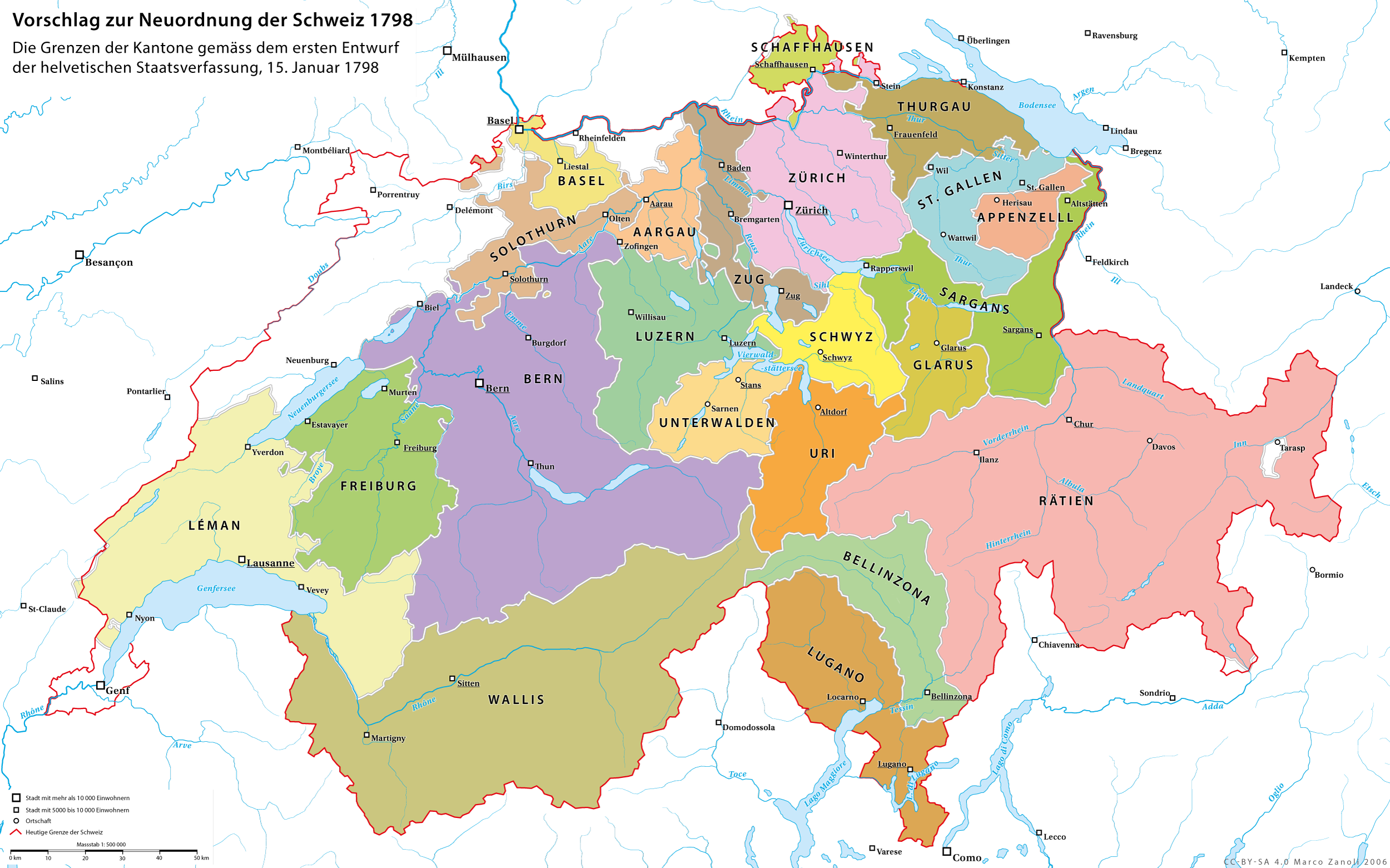
Provisional constitution of the Helvetic Republic, 15 January 1798.

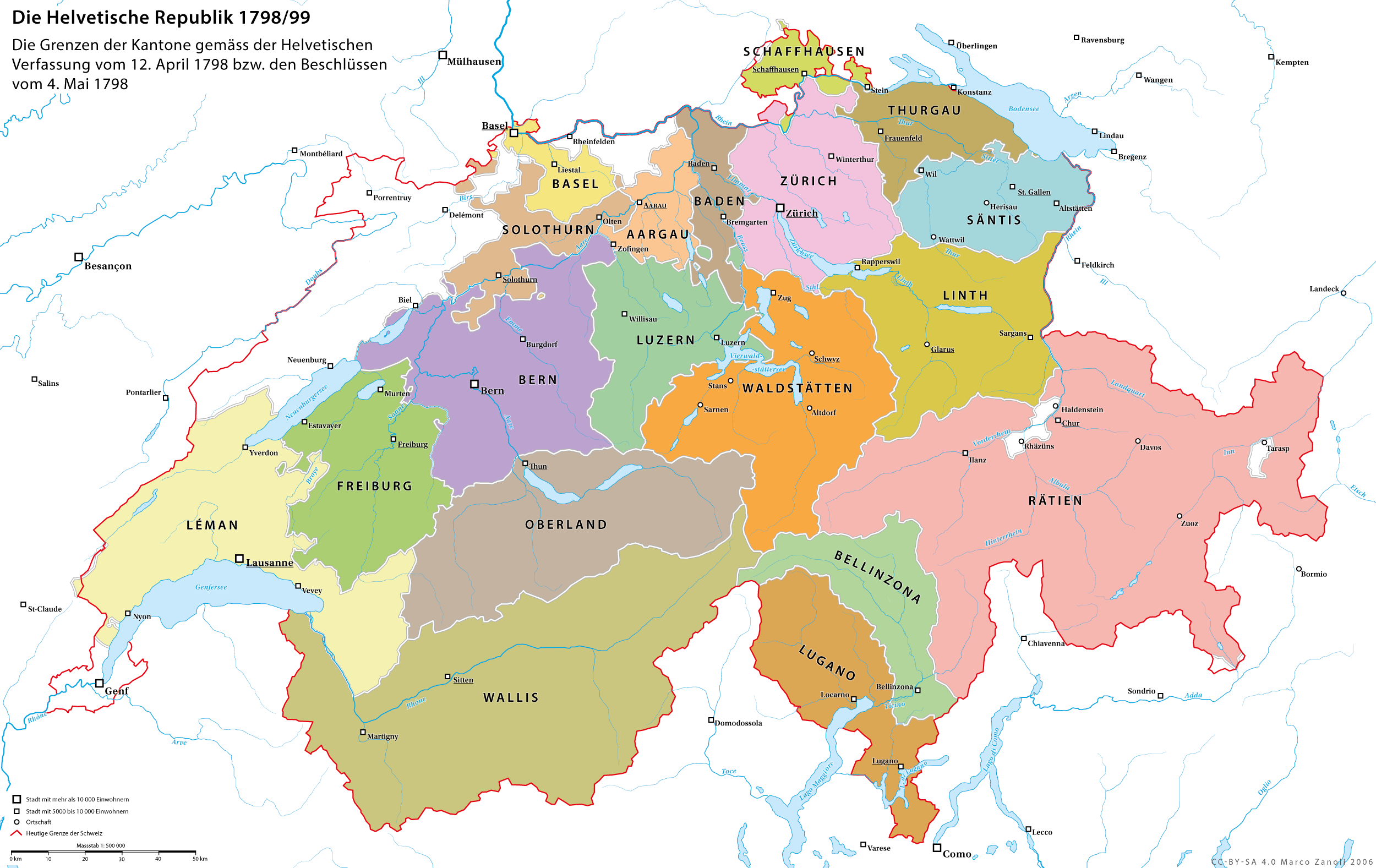
Constitution of the Helvetic Republic, 12 April 1798.

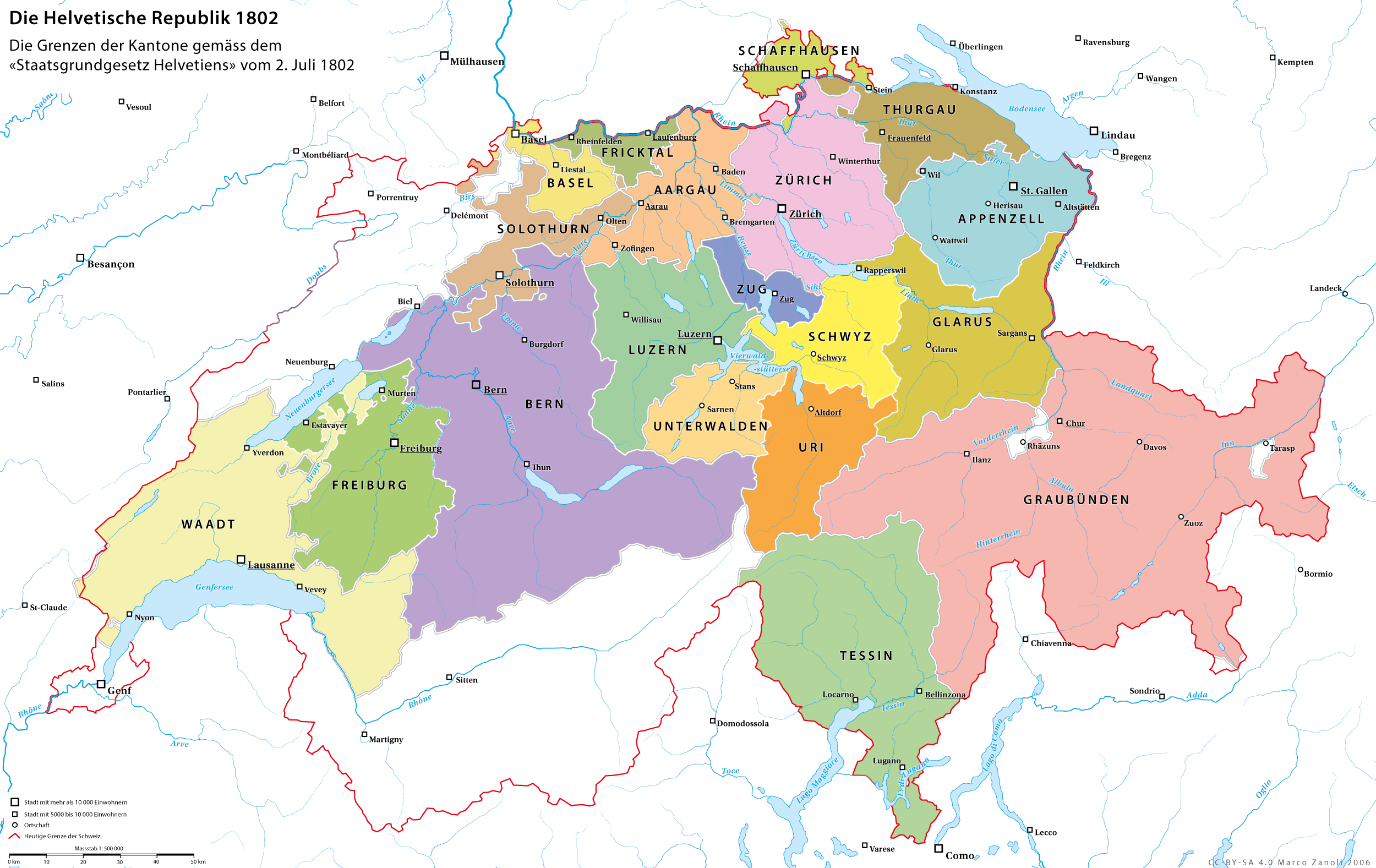
Helvetic Republic, with borders as at the Second Helvetic constitution of 25 May 1802.

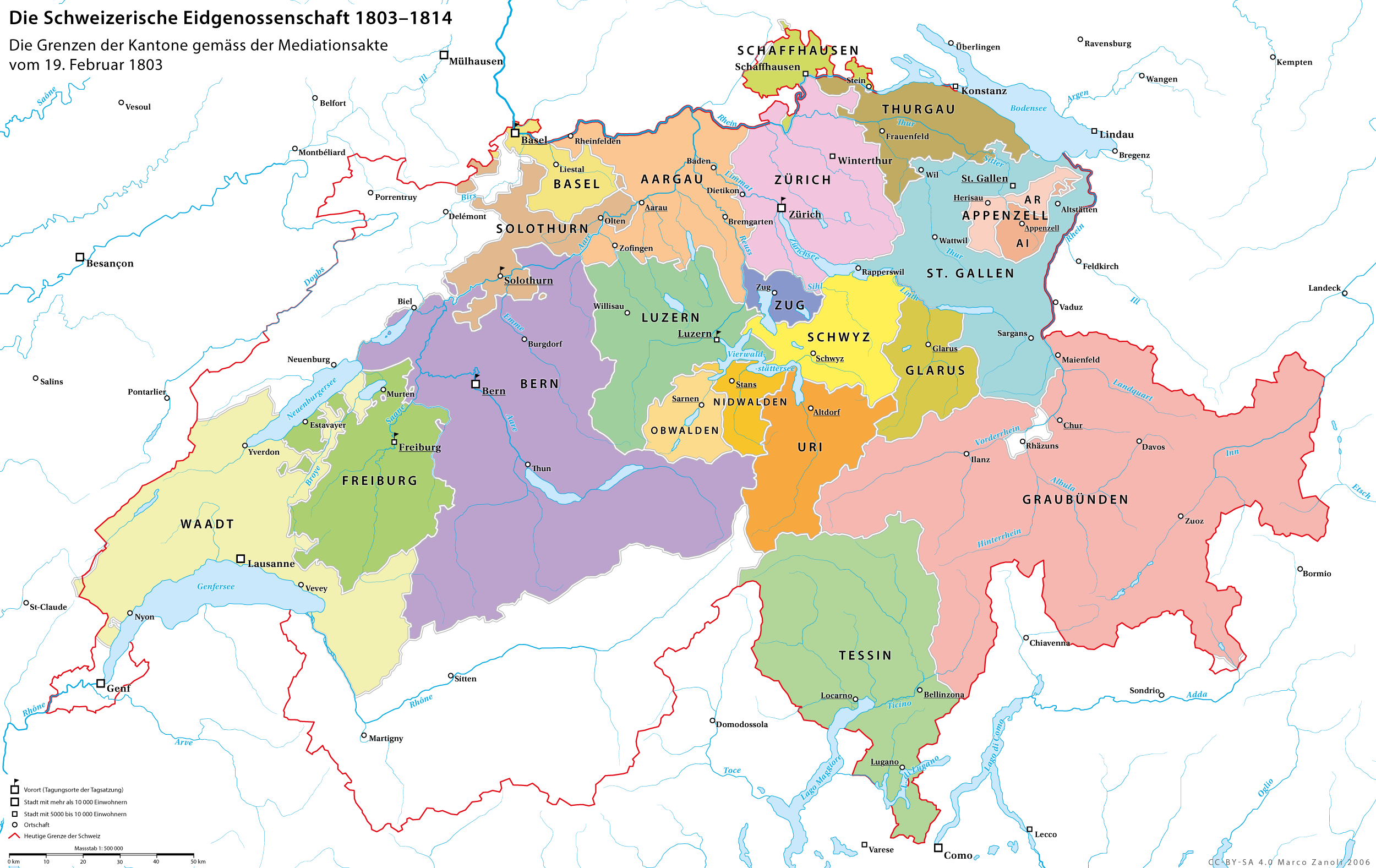
Switzerland after Act of Mediation, during Napoleonic Era, until 1815.

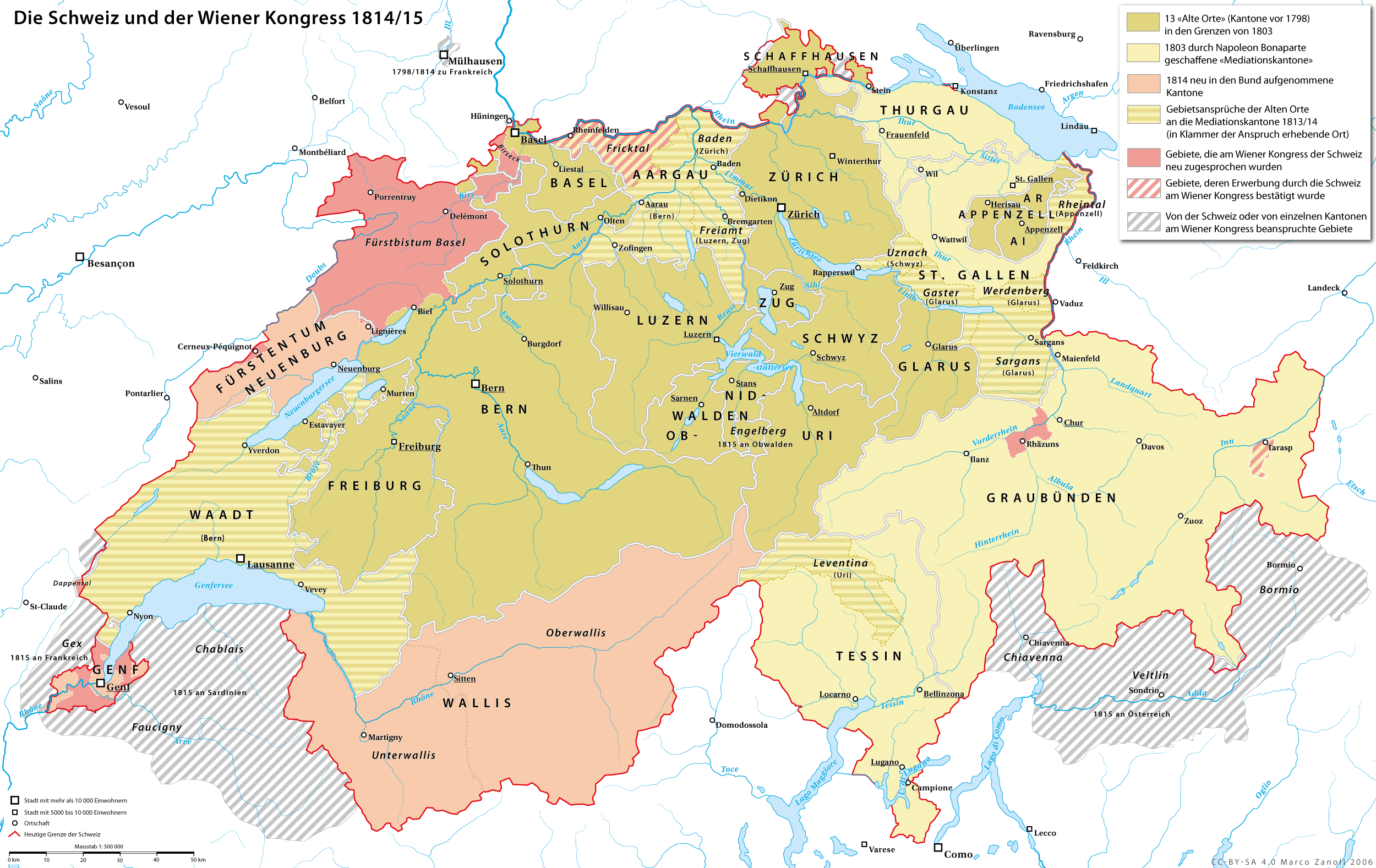
Re-organization and enlargement of Switzerland during the Congress of Vienna in 1814.

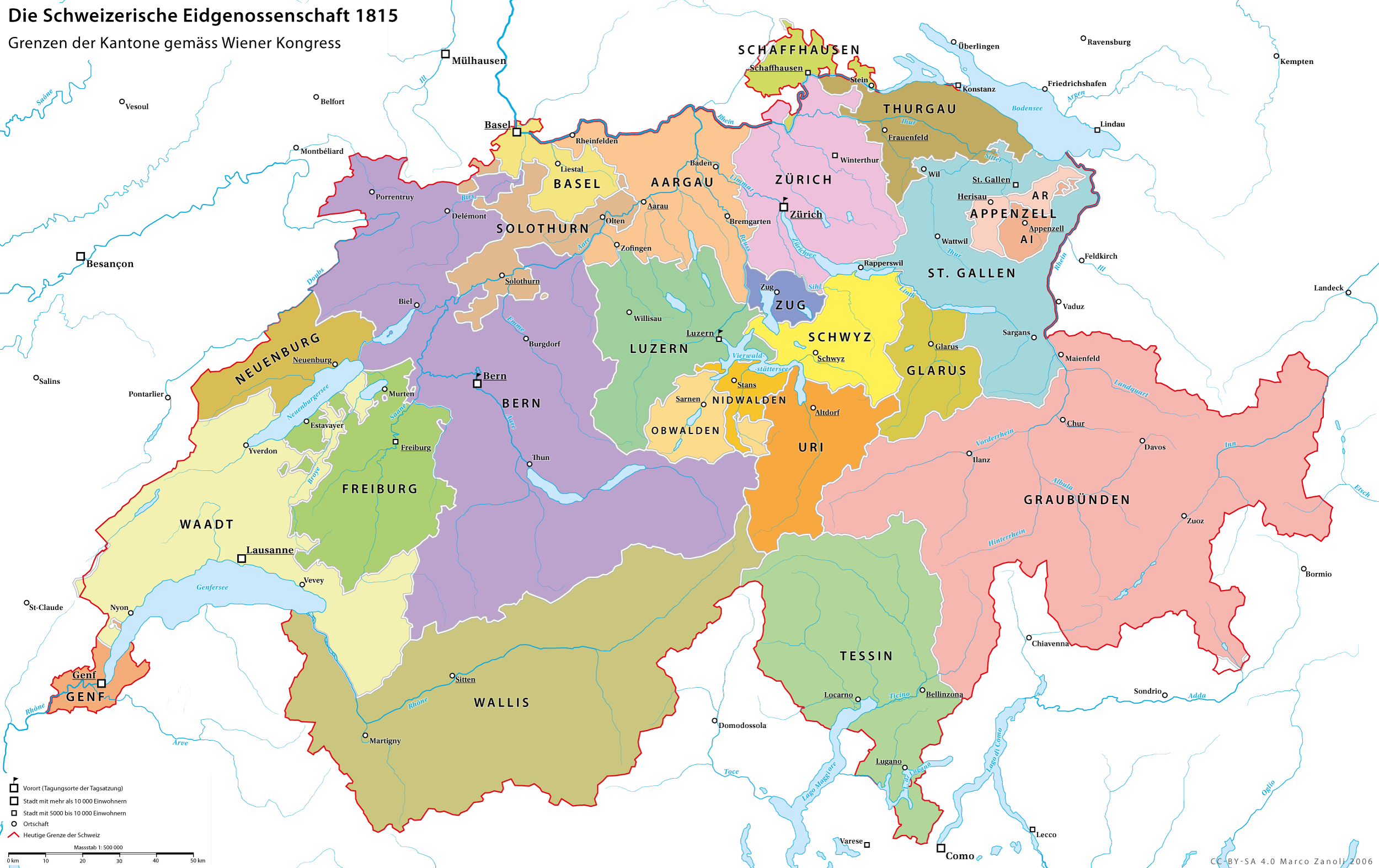
Switzerland during the Restoration, 1815–1847.

== See also ==
- Jura separatism
- Alemannic separatism
- Euroscepticism
- Switzerland as a federal state
