= Domà Nunch =

- President: Lorenzo Banfi
- National Secretary: Marco Pasian
- Founded: 2005
- Dissolved: 2020
- Merger of: M.S.R.N.I (2006)
- Merged into: Brothers of Italy
- Headquarters: Saronno, Italy
- Newspaper: El Dragh Bloeu (2006-2010)
- Membership (2012): 300
- Ideology: Insubrism; Econationalism; Identitarism; Separatism
- Political position: Right-wing

Website
- www.domanunch.org

Domà Nunch ('only us' in Lombard) was an eco-nationalist social movement that has been active under different forms in Insubria, across the border between Italy and Switzerland, between 2005 and 2020.

== Association ==
Domà Nunch was founded in 2005 as a spin-off project of the Moviment Spiritual Riformaa di Nativ d'Insubria (Reformed Spiritual Movement of Insubria's Natives), previously created in 2003 by Lorenzo Banfi, renewing and reissuing El Dragh Bloeu (The Blue Dragon), which then became the official magazine of the new association. Lorenzo Banfi, linguist and author, led Domà Nunch as president as soon as the organisation got expanded in 2007. Domà Nunch believed in self-determination and independence of Insubria as way to preserve the heritage, history, language and environment of the region. It also promotes the re-unification of portions of Insubria presently split among Lombardy, Piedmont, and Switzerland. However, Domà Nunch never or limited defined itself to belong to the traditional independentist political area, rather outlining to be a "national" movement.

Domà Nunch was opposed to urbanization and the concretization of land. Particularly, their members had been against new highway projects, such as the Pedemontana Lombarda proposed by the Regional Council of Lombardy. Also, Domà Nunch aimed to maintain taxation locally in Insubria in order to reclaim the land. Temporarily cooperation led to merging Domà Nunch's actions with major campaigning environmentalist organisations, such as WWF, Italia Nostra, Fondo per l'Ambiente Italiano and Legambiente.

In the first activity period, Domà Nunch had published a number of books on ecology and local language, as well as organised events. These included:

- The National Day of Insubria, every 5 September, according to the date of foundation of the Duchy of Milan;
- Commemoration of the ICMESA disaster in Seveso;
- The Forum on Environmental Emergencies in Insubria, in 2007, Uboldo;
- The Forum on the Milanese Language, in 2007, Nerviano, attended by the major linguistic associations of the region;
- The conference Olona: A Valley at Its Crossroad, in 2008, Gorla Minore;
- Olona: A Valley Festival in 2008;
- Street rallies against the A36 (Autostrada Pedemontana Lombarda) project, in 2009 and 2010.

In 2010 Domà Nunch replied to the Enlargement of Switzerland motion proposing an integration between Switzerland and Insubria in order to join into a new confederation.

== Political movement ==
=== First Period ===
In December 2011, Domà Nunch actually ceased its activity as a cultural association and changed into a political movement with the target to run for the 2013 Lombard regional election, though this never actually happened.

In February 2012, Domà Nunch provoked the public opinion by issuing a local currency called Franch stating this would be "the money of the people, to save our economy". Issued banknotes were portraying historical lombard characters like Francesco II Sforza.

In September of the same year, Domà Nunch activists had been attacked by individuals linked with left-wing social center and Italian General Confederation of Labour while the econationalists rallying in Desio against Mafia presence in Insubria and Pedemontana motorway construction Domà Nunch claimed CGIL to have responsibility in the tempted assault.

After this stage, in April 2013 Domà Nunch signed a cooperation agreement with Terra Insubre, a cultural association based in Varese and Milan that shared most of Domà Nunch's objectives. This led to a convention in Milan on 4 May to remember the Bava-Beccaris massacre.

In December 2013 Domà Nunch communicated to put on hold its political activity.

=== Second Period ===
At the end of 2014 the movement published and presented the booklet Appunti per una Repubblica Sacra (Notes for a Sacred Republic) stating the "felt need to consolidate the definition of the political and spiritual vision" and "with the intend to outline the peculiarity of the argumentations proposed, and claim in a more official way the paternity of the ideas expressed in the last years". In 2015, Domà Nunch announced to take part at the elections for the municipality of Saronno in alliance with Lega Nord The coalition eventually won and the econational movement was assigned a Councillor for Ecology and Sport. In January 2020, the movement announced to adhere to⠀Brothers of Italy⠀both at the local and national levels, "being convinced to bring into⠀Giorgia Meloni's party the experience of eco-nationalism, radicated in Insubria and for the interest of Italy".

== Leadership ==
- President of the National Diet (Maester): Lorenzo Banfi (2007–2013; 2015-2019)
- National Secretary: Matteo Colaone (2009–2013); Marco Pasian (2015-2019)

== See also ==
- Insubria
- Lombard language
- Milanese dialect
- Enlargement of Switzerland
