= Jemníky =

- Municipality
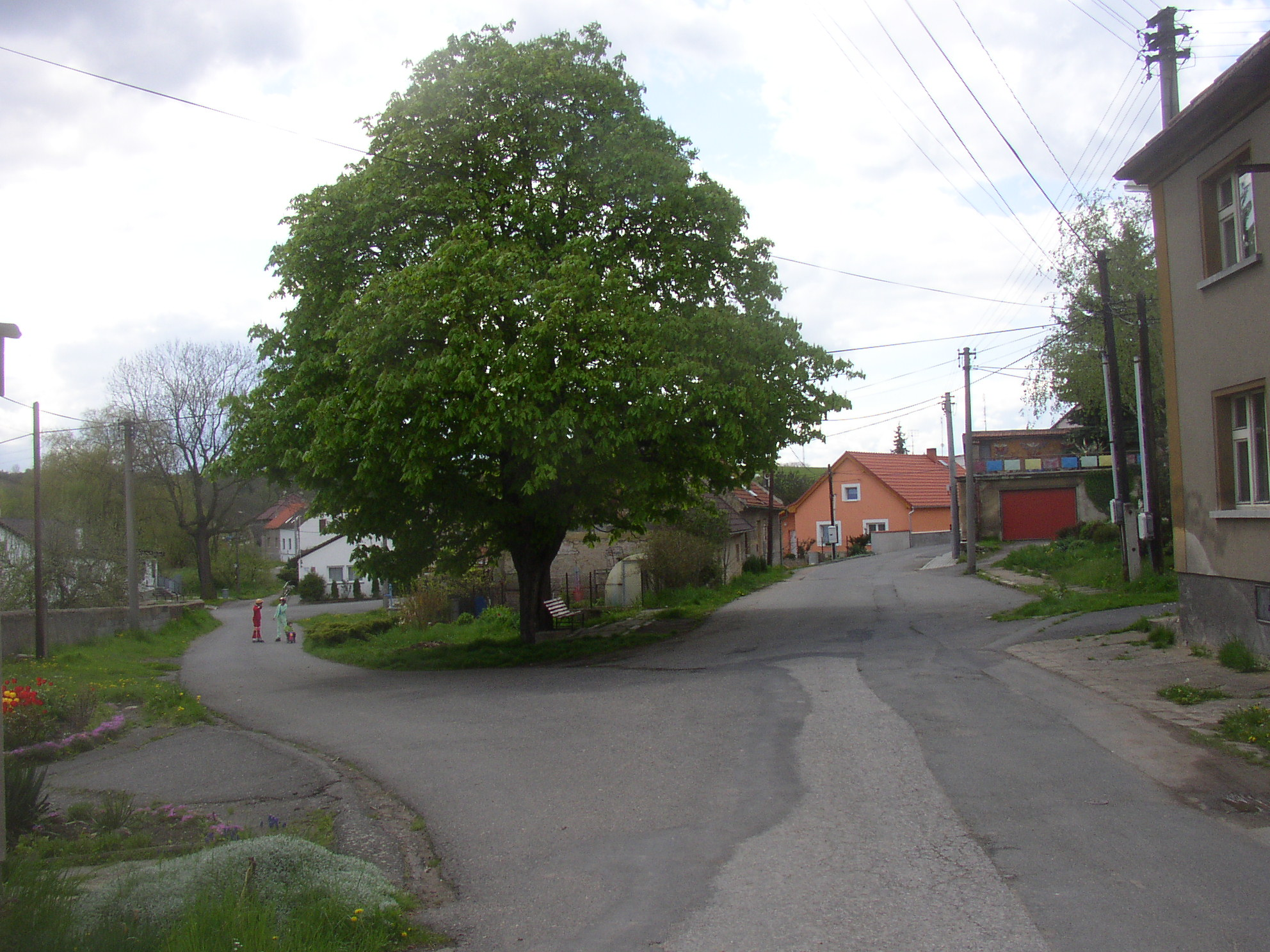
- Centre of Jemníky

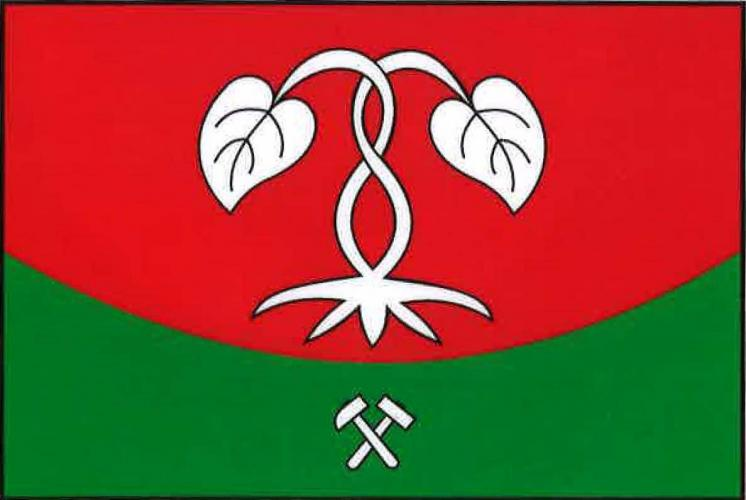
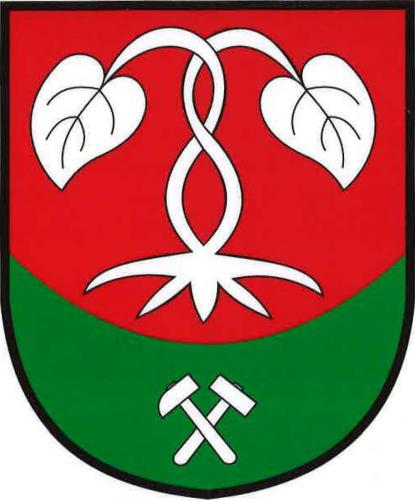
- Flag Coat of arms

- Location in the Czech Republic
- Coordinates: 50°12′27″N 14°7′9″E
- Country: Czech Republic
- Region: Central Bohemian
- District: Kladno
- First mentioned: 1227

Area
  - Total: 2.88 km^{2} (1.11 sq mi)
- Elevation: 250 m (820 ft)

Population (2026-01-01)
  - Total: 298
  - Density: 103/km^{2} (268/sq mi)
- Time zone: UTC+1 (CET)
  - Summer (DST): UTC+2 (CEST)
- Postal code: 274 01
- Website: www.obecjemniky.cz

Jemníky is a municipality and village in Kladno District in the Central Bohemian Region of the Czech Republic. It has about 300 inhabitants.

== Demographics ==
Historical population
Year	Pop.	±%
1869	312	—
1880	434	+39.1%
1890	458	+5.5%
1900	414	−9.6%
1910	456	+10.1%
1921	429	−5.9%
1930	422	−1.6%
1950	368	−12.8%
1961	375	+1.9%
1970	321	−14.4%
1980	283	−11.8%
1991	217	−23.3%
2001	194	−10.6%
2011	278	+43.3%
2021	281	+1.1%
Source: Censuses

== Notable people ==
- Georg Druschetzky (1745–1819), composer and musician
