= Georg Druschetzky =

Czech composer, oboist and timpanist (1745–1819)

Georg Druschetzky (born Jiří Družecký; 7 April 1745 – 21 June 1819) was a Czech composer in the Classical period, oboist and timpanist.

== Biography ==
Druschetzky was born Jiří Družecký in Jemníky, Bohemia on 7 April 1745. He studied oboe with the noted oboist and composer Antonio Besozzi in Dresden, Saxony. He then joined the band of an infantry regiment in Cheb (German: Eger), with which he was later stationed (sequentially) in Vienna, Enns, Linz, and Branau. In 1777 he was certified as a drummer. In 1783 he moved to Vienna, where he became a member of the Tonkünstler-Sozietät. Three years later he was Kapellmeister for Anton Grassalkovič of Gyaraku and moved to Bratislava.

It is believed he started writing music in the 1770s, most of it for his band. He also wrote chamber music and music for orchestra, including 27 Symphonies and Concertos for various instruments. A couple of his operas survive, but one suite of incidental music and a ballet are lost. Druschetzky is credited with one of the earliest uses of the BACH motif. Druschetzky died in Buda, Hungary on 21 June 1819.

== Selected compositions ==
Stage

- Mechmet, Opera
- Zemira, Opera
- Perseus and Andromeda, Incidental music to the play
- Inkle and Yariko, Ballet

Orchestral

- Concerto in B♭ major for oboe and orchestra
- Concerto in C major for oboe and orchestra
- Concerto in F major for oboe and orchestra
- Concerto for 6 timpani and orchestra
- Concerto in D major for viola and orchestra; The solo viola part is written in the key of C major requiring a scordatura tuning a whole step higher.
- Gran Sinfonia in C major
- Harmonia – for 21 wind instruments (1790)
- Partita in C major for timpani and chamber orchestra
- Partita in F major
- Sinfonia alla battaglia for string and brass orchestra
- Sinfonia in C

Chamber music

- Quartet for bassethorn, violin, viola and cello
- Quintet in F major for horn, violin, 2 violas and cello (1810)
- Sextet for 2 clarinets, 2 horns and 2 bassoons
- 6 Sonatas for solo violin and basso continuo, Op. 1 (Linz, 1783)
- Sonata for mandolin and bass in G
- String Quartet No. 1
- String Quartet No. 2
- String Quartet No. 3 in D major
- Trio for 3 bassethorns

Choral

- Missa solemnis for soloists, mixed chorus and orchestra (1804)

== Discography ==
Some of Druschetzky's music has been recorded on the Naxos Records label, such as his Timpani Concerto on a disc titled Virtuoso Timpani Concertos. All Parthias have been recorded on the Aulia Label by I Fiati Italiani.

The first complete recording of Druschetzky's Divertissement for three basset horns was recorded on the Hevhetia label by Lotz Trio ensemble. Four of his Quartets for oboe, violin, viola & cello (F major, G minor, E flat major, and C major) are recorded on Georg Druschetzky: Oboe Quartets on the Hungaroton Classic label, and a selection of his wind music (Amphion Wind Octet) on the ACCENT label.
