= Carlo Besozzi =

Italian composer

Carlo Besozzi (1738 – 22 March 1791) was an Italian oboist composer and member of an extensive family of oboists from the eighteenth-century Naples. Nephew of Gaetano Besozzi, he was employed in the orchestra of the Elector of Dresden and travelled extensively throughout Europe with his father, playing in London, Paris, Stuttgart and Salzburg, where he received good notices from Leopold Mozart.

== Biography ==
Besozzi was born in Naples, or in Dresden as reported by another source, as the son of oboist and composer Antonio Besozzi, who was undoubtedly his teacher. From 1754 Carlo Besozzi joined his father as oboist in the Dresden Kapelle, in the service of the Electress of Saxony Maria Antonia Walpurgis. (Note: Carlo was born in 1738, and by 1755 he was receiving as much as his father with a salary of 1,000 Thalers.) However, the Dresden opera house was destroyed by the Prussians in the Seven Years' War (1756–63), breaking up the remarkable group of musicians assembled by Elector Frederick Augustus II. He performed in Paris in December of that year and escaped to London in early 1757. He then traveled extensively through Germany, France and Italy, acquiring by that time not only almost unparalleled skill on the oboe, but also even greater reputation than his father, and spent 1758–9 playing under Niccolò Jommelli in Stuttgart. His father was back on the Dresden payroll by 1764, and Carlo stayed with the court until the year of his death.

In September 1772, when Charles Burney visited Dresden, praised his extremely delicate flavor, beautiful tone and intonation. He accurately described the technique employed by Besozzi to play his instrument. In September 1774, Carlo took a leave from his duties at the Saxon capital and went to Turin, where he visited his parents and may have waited out the rest of the war there. He was in Salzburg in May 1778, where he was deemed positively by Leopold Mozart. In 1792, he left Dresden and went back to Italy, disappearing from the public.

== Musical works ==
Besozzi composed several concertos and sonatas, mostly for the oboe. His concerts were clearly written to be played by himself, and were designed to show his skill. The final movements of these compositions denote a predominantly serious mood with a clear influence from Sturm und Drang. With his father and Johann Christian Fischer, Besozzi may have been a collaborator of the instrument-makers Grenser and Grundmann, who produced the prototypical European Classical hautboy (oboe) in Dresden around this time.

- Concertos for oboe, including 6 in C major, 5 in G major, 3 in F major, 3 in B major, 2 in D major, 1 in E major and 1 in G minor.
- Concerto in C major for 2 oboes
- 24 sonatas for 2 oboes, horns and basso continuo
- Sonata for 2 oboes
- Sonata for oboe and basso continuo
- Divertimento for 2 flutes and cello
