= Cristoforo Besozzi =

Italian composer

Cristoforo Besozzi (1661 in Milan – 22 October 1725, in Piacenza) was an Italian oboist, bassoonist and founder of a large family of wind players very influential around Parma, Naples and Turin for more than 200 years. In 1700, he settled in Parma, taking part as oboist in the ducal hautboy band Guardia Irlandese with his son Giuseppe Besozzi in 1711. His other two sons, Alessandro and Paolo Girolamo Besozzi, joined him from 1714.
