= Dominique Baettig =

Swiss politician (born 1953)

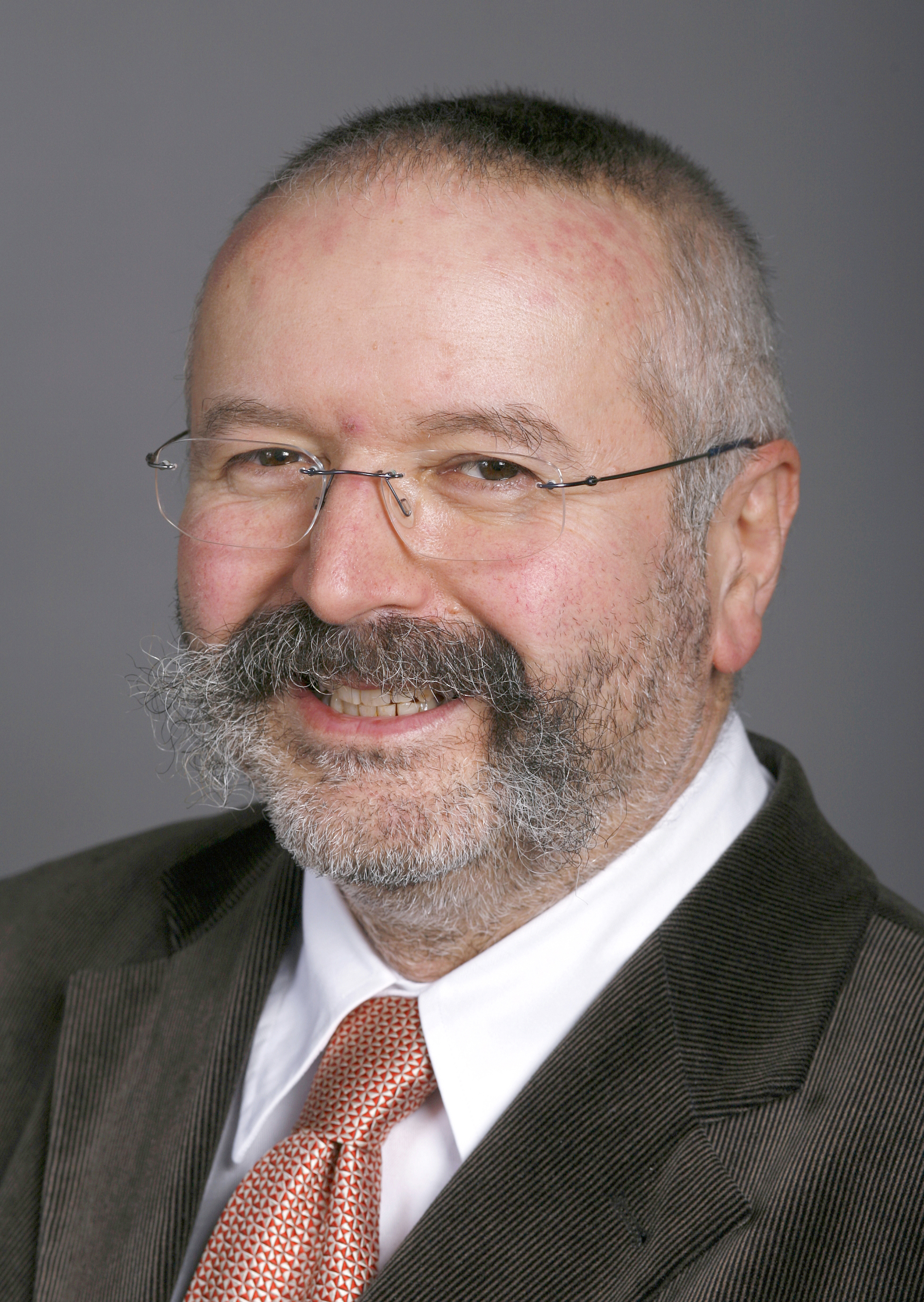

Member of the National Council (Switzerland)
- In office 3 December 2007 – 4 December 2011
- Constituency: Jura

Personal details
- Born: September 22, 1953 (age 73) Delémont
- Party: Swiss People's Party

Dominique Baettig (born 22 September 1953, in Delémont) is a Swiss politician and member of the Swiss People's Party. A psychiatrist by profession, he represented the canton of Jura in the National Council in the 2007–2011 legislature.

== Political views ==
In response to the Durban Review Conference, Baettig accused the Holocaust of being an instrument of Zionism to suppress free speech and demonize opponents, criticizing the belief it is not subject to historical review and examination.

In 2010, Baettig submitted a motion to change the constitution in anticipation of a possible future enlargement of Switzerland. It was co-signed by SVP president Toni Brunner.

Baettig played a role in successfully blocking a visit by former U.S. President George W. Bush to the country in February 2011, lobbying the federal prosecutor's office to have him arrested stemming from war crimes charges. Later that year, he filed another interpellation to have former U.S. Secretary of State Henry Kissinger detained if he attended the Bilderberg Conference in the country in June. The Young SVP organized a conference in protest along with the Young Socialists.

Baettig said the 2011 Bilderberg conference, of which Kissinger attended, violated the principles of Swiss sovereignty. Baettig approached the gates of the Suvretta House Hotel, while the conference was being held, and asked to be admitted as "a member of the Swiss parliament". He was refused entry.
