= Paolo Girolamo Besozzi =

Italian composer

Paolo Girolamo Besozzi (17 April 1704 – 1778) was an Italian oboe virtuoso and bassoonist who devoted his life to the study of the bassoon and oboe. He was born in Parma. Together with his brothers Giuseppe and Alessandro Besozzi, he took part from June 1714 in the ducal hautboy band Guardia Irlandese, created in 1702 by Antonio Farnese, Duke of Parma, and remaining in service until his nephew Antonio Besozzi succeeded him on 30 December 1727.

Around 1730, he moved back to Turin and became a member of the chapel court orchestra along with his brother Alessandro. During his stay in Paris with Alessandro in 1735, he worked on the Sonata for Bassoon and Basso Continuo in B flat major and five other Sonatas Trio for two violins and violoncello, published around 1750 by Canavasse. According to a letter of Leopold Mozart dated 28 May 1778, he would have died in Turin in 1778.
