= Frédéric Viret =

Frédéric Viret (French: [fʁedeʁik viʁɛ]; 18 February 1822 – 3 May 1898) was a French choirmaster, composer of sacred music and leader of a society of amateur male and female choristers of high vocal range.

== Biography ==
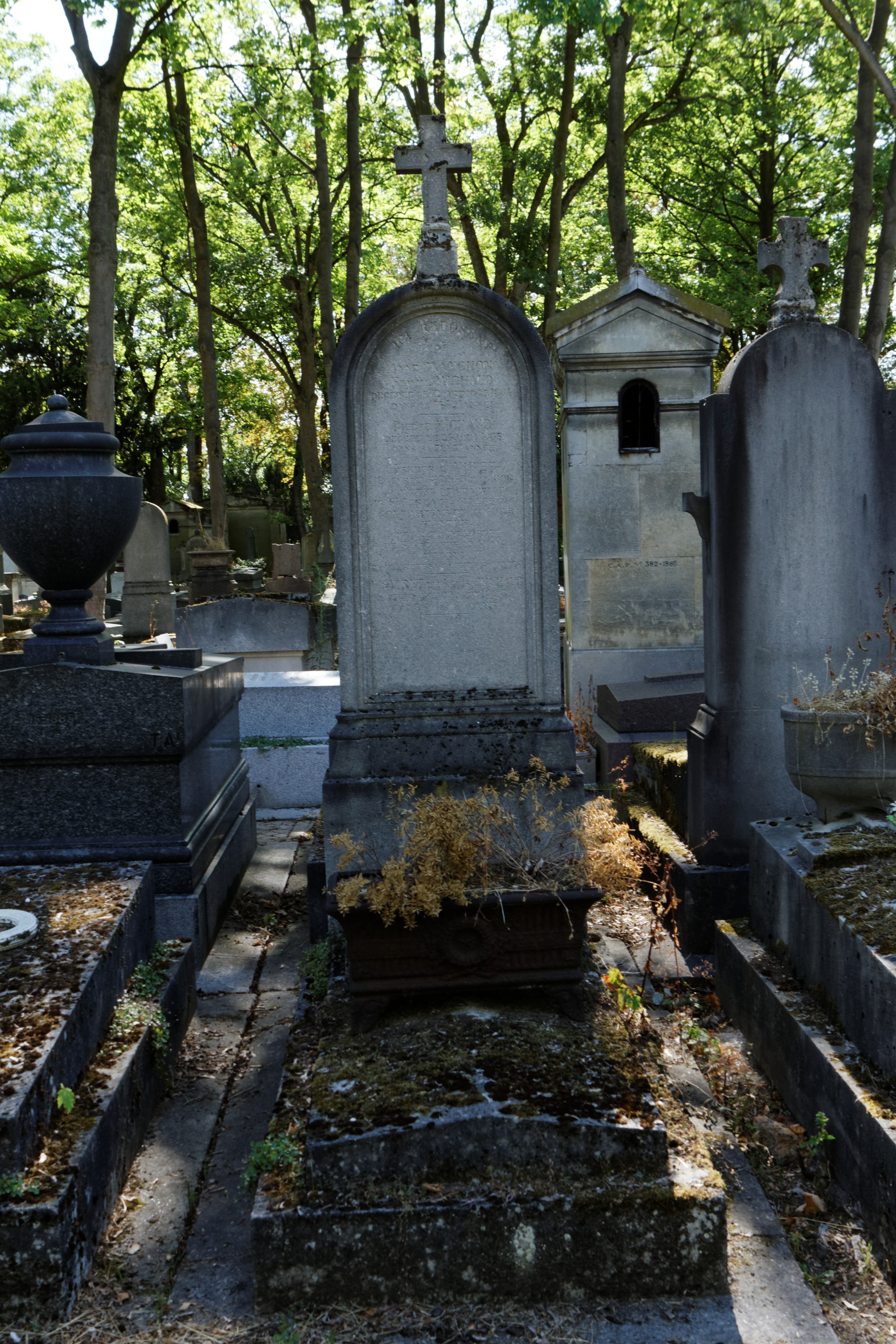
Tomb of Frédéric Viret, Père-Lachaise Cemetery, Paris.

A pupil of the masters of the Church of Saint-Merri and Saint-Roch, Viret was kapellmeister of the Imperial Church of Saint-Germain l'Auxerrois from 1854, with several scholarly associations appointing him a founding member of the "Société des sciences industrielles, Arts et Belles lettres de Paris" and the "Société libre des Beaux-Arts". Praised for his sensitivity, he was admired for his fine character, the warmth of his singing and the beauty of his voice.

At sixteen, he was deemed capable of directing the choir at Saint-Merri. He conducted masses performed by an orchestra composed of 150 artists together with scholar J. B. Stiegler, a member of the Bavarian Academy of Music whom he had met in Paris and accompanied to Germany while he perfected in the art of singing, and organist Johann Peter Cavallo with whom he had published Les Veillées des Salons, a musical magazine of piano music and vocal scores.

Viret was also an autodidactic painter, poet and amateur photographer.

== Selected works ==
Among the works that have most contributed to his reputation are:

- Les Chants du Psalmiste (4th collection of psalms), a compendium of songs containing the first collection of the Psalms of David for four male voices
- Six Messes solennelles, for three and four voices.
- Soixante Motels, almost all unpublished excerpts from the repertory of the Imperial Church St-Germain l'Auxerrois.
- Un Recueil de cantiques à Marie
- Au bord d'un vaisseau, grand lyrical symphony for four male voices without accompaniment
- L'Egypte, symphonic ode for four male voices and female voices, without accompaniment
- Les Pionniers du genre humain, grand cantata for four male voices and female voices without accompaniment
- Les Veillées des salons, a collection of songs and cantilenas with piano accompaniment
- Trente Choeurs, for four male voices (4th collection of psalms) without accompaniment, a work awarded a gold medal
