= Girolamo Besozzi =

Italien oboist and composer

Girolamo Besozzi (1745 or 1750 in Naples – 1788 in Paris) was an Italian composer and oboist and member of a renowned family of wind players. Son of composer Gaetano Besozzi and nephew of Antonio Besozzi, he became oboist in the court orchestra in Naples from 1765. By 1770, he moved to Paris, where he played in the Concert Spirituel before the King of France.

He was known as a composer of chamber music. His Sonata for Bassoon and Piano in B-flat major is an integral part of the literature for the instrument. His son Henri Besozzi was a flautist at the Paris Opera, and his grandson the composer Louis Désiré Besozzi.
