= Johann Peter Cavallo =

German organist, pianist and composer

- Born: 23 December 1819; Munich, Kingdom of Bavaria
- Origin: Paris, France
- Died: 19 April 1892 (aged 72)
- Genres: Classical, chamber
- Instruments: Organ, piano

Johann Peter Cavallo (23 December 1819 – 19 April 1892) was a German organist, pianist and composer of Italian origin and active in France.

== Life ==
Born in Munich, Cavallo settled in Paris around 1842, where he was organist in the churches of St. Vincent de Paul, St. Germain-des-Prés and St. Nicolas des Champs between 1851 and 1863. He became famous as a pianist in the 1850s. He published, among others, Veillées des salons, a monthly sheet music magazine of short piano pieces of his own compositions in association with choirmaster Frédéric Viret.

== Selected works ==
- Valse rustique, Op. 24
- Le Crépuscule, Op. 33
- Un Dernier jour d'hiver, Op. 46
- Mazurka, Op. 47
- La Tristesse, Op. 48
- Fandango, Op. 49
- Le Vertige, Op. 50
- Pensée fugitive, Op. 56
- Galop des Sylphes, Op. 57
- Près la fontaine du loup, Op. 61
