= Insubria =

Historical-geographical region in Europe

Territory of Insubria Euroregion

Insubria is a historical-geographical region which corresponds to the area inhabited in Classical antiquity by the Insubres; the name can also refer to the Duchy of Milan (1395–1810). For several centuries this name stood for an area stretching approximately between the Adda river in the east and the Sesia river in the west, and between the San Gottardo Pass in the north and the Po river in the south, thus it was a synonym of the Milan region and the surrounding countryside corresponding with Lombardy in modern Italy.

== History ==
Flag of the Duchy of Milan and modern symbol of Insubria

Polybius claims the Insubres founded the city of Milan around 600 BC. They were a Celtic or Ligurian people which dwelt in the 4th–5th century BC in the area of pre-Alpine lakes (the Italian Lakes) and Milan. The name Insubres is visible in the middle portion of the Tabula Peutingeriana.

The symbol of Insubria (when conceived as the Duchy of Milan) is the Milanese Ducal flag, the Visconti child-swallowing serpent quartered with the Imperial eagle. For further details, see the Duchy of Milan.

== Regio Insubrica Euroregion ==
At present, the meaning of the term Insubria is perceived as more restricted, as it indicates the territory of the cross-boundary cooperation community Regio Insubrica, which was set up in 1995 by the Italian provinces of Varese, Como, Verbano-Cusio-Ossola together with the Swiss Canton Ticino: that is to say, the lakes area between Italy and Switzerland where the Italian language is spoken. The Regio Insubrica was recently extended to the territories of the provinces of Novara and Lecco.

It is a Euroregion (complying with the Madrid Agreement by the Council of Europe) which promotes cross-boundary cooperation in the Italian-Swiss region of the three pre-Alpine lakes (i.e., Lake Como, Lake Lugano and Lake Maggiore).

== Linguistics ==
From an ethnolinguistic viewpoint, Insubria also comprises the provinces of Novara, Lecco, Milan, and Lodi, that is, those areas in which the Western Lombard or Insubrian variety of Lombard language is spoken and which correspond to the territory of the former Duchy of Milan until its takeover by the Habsburg Empire as a result of the Treaty of Baden in 1714 or, better said, of the Treaty of Campo Formio (1797), which marks the end of the first Austrian domination.

== Modern and contemporary uses ==
The word "Insubria" was considered for long a mere synonym of Lombardy, especially in the Ducal age, that is, from the late Middle Ages to the Renaissance.

From the 14th to the 17th century, among the men of letters at the Milan Ducal Court, the terms "Insubre" and "Insubria" were used to give awareness of unity and a higher national identity to the still vital autonomous communes.

"Insubria" thus denoted the core of the then extensive Duchy of Milan, as attested in the writings of Benzo d'Alessandria, Giovanni Simonetta, Thomas Coryat, Bernardino Corio and Andrea Alciato. In the 17th century Gabriele Verri reaffirmed that concept using the following motto, which he placed as a heading in all his works: "Insubres sumus, non latini" ("We are Insubrians, not Latins").

In 1797, following the occupation of the Duchy of Milan by the French, Napoleon I had the Milan mint strike a commemorative medal with the dedication "All'Insubria Libera" ("To Free Insubria") and an allegory of the French Republic, which was represented as a woman wearing a headpiece and helped on the right hand by Peace, who places the Phrygian cap onto Insubria's head. Insubria is led by a putto and has a horn of plenty at her feet.

In the 1930s, a review called Insubria was published, whose aim was promoting tourism and culture of the pre-Alpine lakes area.

The term fell into oblivion until the 1990s, when Insubria came into favour again because of a series of events, the first of which was the founding (in 1995) of the above-mentioned "Regio Insubrica", a cross-boundary cooperation community whose aim is to promote the cultural, economic and social elements which draw Italian Switzerland and the border provinces together.

The newspaper La Prealpina, followed by others, added a daily page headed "Insubria" reporting local political news.

In 1996 the Terra Insubre Cultural Association was officially set up in Varese; its purposes are the spreading and promotion of the history and natural environment of the Insubrian territory to a vast audience. At present (2006) the association has about 1500 members and two detached branches (Milan and Marcallo con Casone), as well as a quarterly review also named Terra Insubre.

In those same years (i.e. 14 July 1998) the University of Insubria was set up as the university pole of the towns of Varese and Como.

== Insubrism ==
In recent years, some politicians have begun to debate the possibility of institutionally constituting Insubria and/or gaining its political autonomy. However, as of today there exist no political parties striving for that goal, but only some cultural and opinion movements.

The Ticino League propose an autonomous Insubria across Italy and Switzerland consisting of Ticino as well as parts of Lombardy and has cooperated with Lega Lombarda towards this goal. The party emerged in 1991 by essentially adopting the Swiss People's Party hardline isolationist and nationalist stances but for the Swiss Italian population and managed to secure 12% of the canton's vote in its first election in 1991.

At the beginning of 2002 the "Movimento degli Indipendenti Insubrici" ("Insubrian Independence Movement") was constituted in the Ticino Canton, and later in the Graubünden Canton. It was led by Werner Nussbaumer, a physician from Gravesano, former member of the Greens and known for his actions aimed at promoting Cannabis indica for therapeutical purposes.

The "Indipendenti Insubrici" had Nussbaumer as their representative in the Gran Consiglio of the Ticino Canton from January 2003 to the following elections in the same year, though he had been originally elected in 1999 among the Greens. The president of the movement in the Insubrian Graubünden was Giancarlo Gruber. Following internal party problems and Nussbaumer's arrest on 22 May 2003, the group disappeared from the political scene.

The activities of Domà Nunch opinion group, the promoter of the "El Dragh Bloeu" online review, started in 2005. The movement was officially presented in Piazza Insubria, Milan, on 6 February 2006. Domà Nunch has no institutional representatives, but it mainly organizes conferences, rallies and popular fairs; among them the annual Insubrian National Day every 5 September, to celebrate the foundation of the Duchy of Milan; the Forum on the Environmental Emergencies in Insubria, which took place in March 2007 in Uboldo; the Forum on the Milanese Language in April 2007 in Nerviano, which reconciled the biggest linguistic associations of the region; the summit Olona: A Broken Valley in March 2008 in Gorla Minore; the three-day Olona Valley Festival in June 2008; and the rallies against the Pedemontana highway project in November 2009 and February 2010. Domà Nunch draws its inspiration from the principles of eco-nationalism, that is to say, a synthesis of environmentalism and requests for the protection of Insubrian cultural identity; it promotes the project of an Insubrian Confederation, based on the Swiss state model.

"Domà Nunch" could be translated from Insubric language as "Only Us" or "Only Our", "El Dragh Bloeu" as "The Blue Dragon".

== Cuisine ==
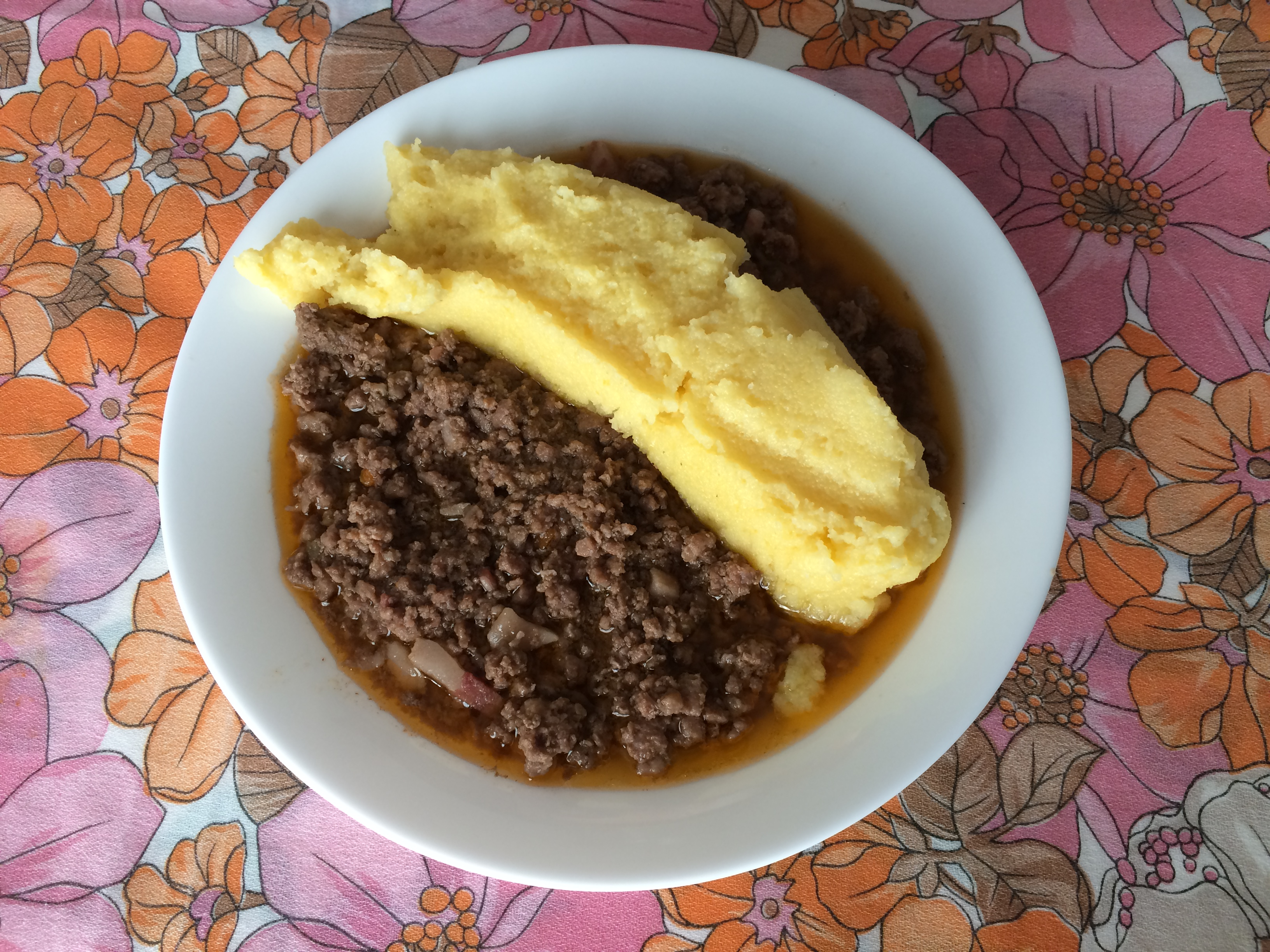
Bruscitti served with polenta porridge

Common in the whole Insubria area are bruscitti, originating from Altomilanese, which consist in a braised meat dish cut very thin and cooked in wine and fennel seeds, historically obtained by stripping leftover meat. In particular the dish is widespread in the province of Varese (Lombardy), in the Alto Milanese area (Lombardy; particularly in the area of the city of Busto Arsizio, where it originates), in the province of Verbano-Cusio-Ossola (Piedmont) and in lower Ticino (Switzerland).

== See also ==
- List of euroregions
