= Henri Besozzi =

Italian flutist

Henri Besozzi (born 1775 in Paris – d. ?) was an Italian flutist, and also one of the last members of an extensive and traditional Neapolitan family of musicians during the seventeenth, eighteenth and beginning of the nineteenth century. He was the son of Girolamo Besozzi and father of Louis Désiré Besozzi, having played at the Opéra-Comique in Paris.
