= Uboldo =

- Comune
- Comune di Uboldo
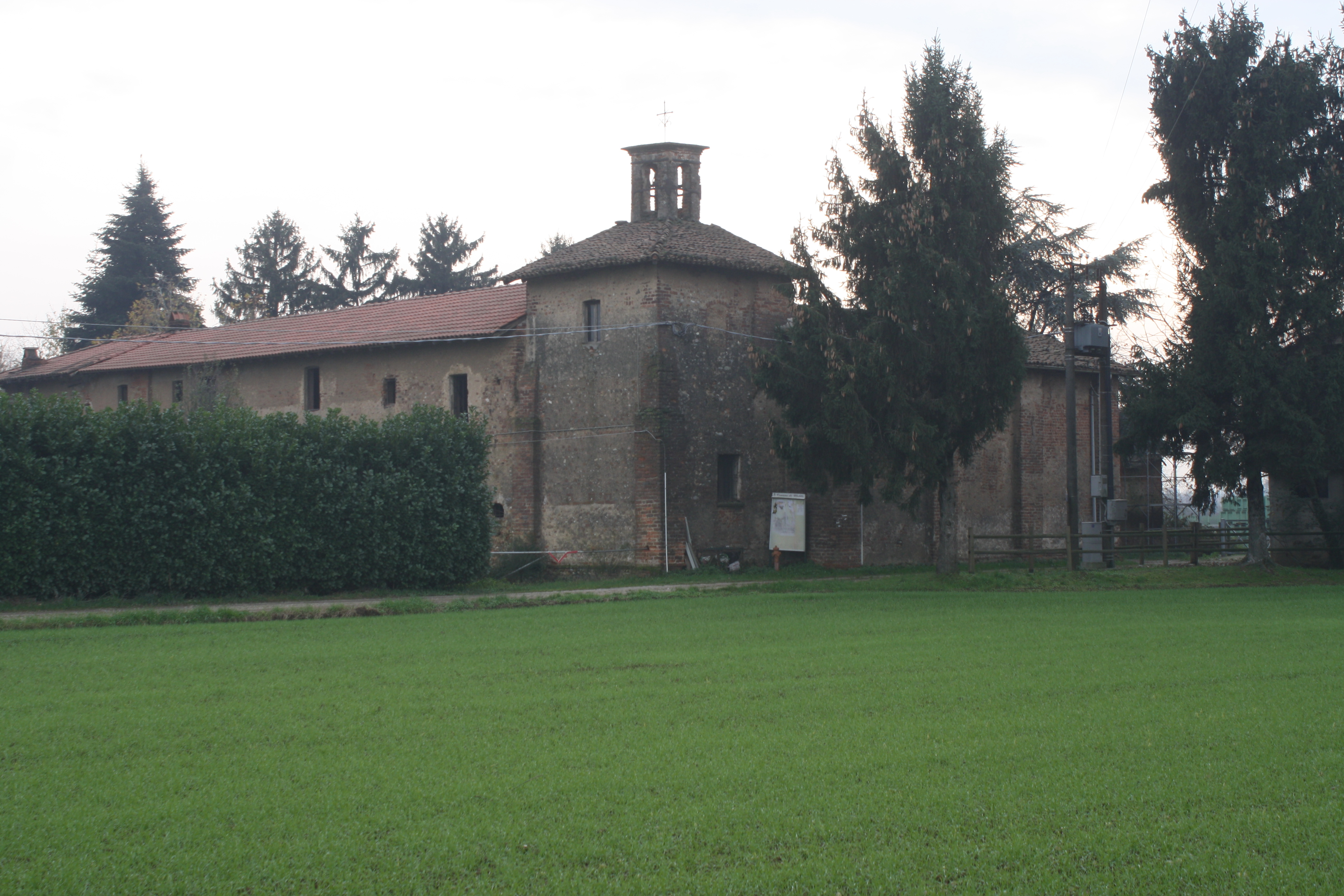

- Coat of arms

- Location within Italy Location within Lombardy
- Coordinates: 45°37′N 9°0′E
- Country: Italy
- Region: Lombardy
- Province: Varese (VA)

Government
  - Mayor: Luigi Clerici

Area
  - Total: 10.6 km^{2} (4.1 sq mi)
- Elevation: 205 m (673 ft)

Population (31 January 2009)
  - Total: 10,182
  - Density: 961/km^{2} (2,490/sq mi)
- Demonym: Uboldesi
- Time zone: UTC+1 (CET)
  - Summer (DST): UTC+2 (CEST)
- Postal code: 21040
- Dialing code: 02
- Website: Official website

Uboldo (Lombard: Ubold [yˈbɔlt] or Ambold [ãˈbɔlt]) is a comune (municipality) in the Province of Varese in the Italian region Lombardy, located about 20 km (12 mi) northwest of Milan and about 25 km (16 mi) southeast of Varese.
