= Antonio Besozzi =

Italian composer

Antonio Besozzi (1714–1781) was an Italian oboist and composer and also member of an extensive family of musicians from the eighteenth-century Naples. He composed several concertos for oboe and a few quintets, which he called "sonatas", for two oboes, two horns and a bassoon.

Besozzi was born in Parma, the son of oboist Giuseppe Besozzi and brother of Girolamo Besozzi. He was from 8 October 1727 to 1731 a member of the Ducal Guardia Irlandese, an hautboy band created in 1702 by Antonio Farnese, Duke of Parma. From 1734, he was active in Naples until the birth of his son Carlo Besozzi in 1738, when he left for Dresden to join the orchestra of the Royal Chapel and become its first oboist in 1739. (Note: Antonio, considered one of the most famous oboists of his time, had a salary of 800 Thalers by 2 October 1739, and from 1745 of 1200 Thalers a month.)

In 1754, he was joined by his son and in early 1757, they travelled to England, where they were known as the Signori Besozzi. In December of that same year they moved to Paris, where they played the Concert Spirituel. In the years 1758–59, he was in the service of the court of Stuttgart, under the direction of Niccolò Jommelli, after which they returned to Dresden until he resigned in 1774. His son continued to play until 1792 though. In May 1778, he played in Salzburg with his son, having been held in high esteem by Leopold Mozart. He then returned to Dresden and after then to Turin, where he settled until his death in 1781.
