= Giuseppe Besozzi =

Italian composer

Giuseppe Besozzi (born 1686 in Milan – died 2 December 1760 in Naples) was an Italian oboist.

Giusepe Besozzi was the eldest son of Cristoforo Besozzi. He came to Parma in 1701, where he was trained as an oboist. He became a member of the Ducal hautboy band Guardia Irlandese, created in 1702 by Antonio Farnese, Duke of Parma, on 1 June 1711. (Note: His file in the archives of the Guardia in Parma reads: "1 June 1711 Giuseppe di Cristoforo Besozzi Milanesi, 25 years old, brown eyes, beard.") In 1728 he was appointed virtuoso suonatore di oboe di SAS at the court of the prince. In 1734 he was assigned to the court of the King of Naples, where he worked until 1738 at the age of 52, probably leaving due to problems with his eyes. Thereafter, he devoted himself to teaching.
