= Alfred Patusset =

French composer, conductor and musical arrangeur

Armand Alfred Patusset (French: [alfʁɛd patysɛ]; 17 November 1853 – 13 or 20 March 1924) was a French composer, conductor and musical arrangeur.

== Life ==
Born in Paris, the son of a musician, Patusset entered the Conservatoire de Paris where he won a second solfège medal in July 1869 then a first medal in 1870 First choir director at the Théâtre des Menus-Plaisirs in 1873 and assistant conductor at the Alcazar in 1885, he became conductor of the Déjazet and Beaumarchais theatres, the Alcazar concert, he Eden-Concert, the Scala and the Théâtre de l'Hippodrome and ended his career at the Folies-Bergère from January 1901.

Also known under the pseudonyms Saint-Amand and Fred Wardal, he is responsible for the music of about sixty songs with lyrics by, among others, Henri Darsay, Adolphe Jost, Eugène Rimbault, Victor de Cottens and Eugène Héros, as well as waltzes and many ballet pieces.

Patusset died in Paris at the age of 70 and is buried at the Père Lachaise Cemetery. His son, Raoul Patusset (1876-1956), a banker by profession, was also an actor, playwright, and theatre administrator.

== Works ==
Operette music

- 1881: Nos belles petites, fantasy in 4 acts and 4 scenes, libretto by Amédée de Jallais and Iginio Manzoni, music by Alfred Patusset and Marc Chautagne, at the Théâtre Déjazet (2 June)
- 1886: Lohengrin à l'Alcazar, parody in 1 act and 3 scenes of Wagner's opera, libretto by Pierre Lebourg and Henri Boucherat, at the Alcazar d'Hiver (26 February)
- 1889: La Reine de Mysotutu, one-act operette, libretto by Octave Pradels and Celmar, at the Scala (17 January)
- 1890: Le Pensionnat Chamerlan, one-act operette, libretto by Julien Sermet and Ernest Lévy, at Concert de l'Horloge (7 June)
- 1891: La Mariée de Mézidon, 3-acts operette, libretto by Julien Sermet and Louis Battaille, at Concert de la Scala (29 August)
- 1891: Lohengrin II, ou Lohengrin à l'Edorado, one-act parody of Wagner's opera, libretto by Julien Sermet and Henri Boucherat, at the Eldorado (14 November)
- 1894: Tahïs, opera-parodie comique à grand tralala, libretto by Louis Battaille and Léon Garnier, at the Concert du Ba-Ta-Clan (2 September)

Incidental music

- 1874: La Comète à Paris, review in 3 acts and 10 scenes by Hector Monréal and Henri Blondeau, music by Alfred Patusset, Marc Chautagne and Robert Planquette, at the Théâtre Déjazet (5 December)
- 1885: Théodora à Montluçon, parody in 1 act and 8 scenes by Guillaume Livet and Henri Boucherat, at the Alcazar d'Hiver (7 February)
- 1887: Il reviendra !, review of the year in 3 scenes by Guillaume Livet and Amédée de Jallais, at the Alcazar d'Hiver (19 November)
- 1887: Vlan ! Touché !, one-act review by Henry Buguet, at the Casino des Arts de Lyon (21 December)
- 1888: Tout autour de la Tour, review in 1 act and 2 scenes by Louis Battaille and Julien Sermet, la Scala (22 November)
- 1889: L'Enfer des revues, revue des revues à grand spectacle in 1 act and 2 scenes by Louis Battaille an Julien Sermet, at la Scala (28 February)
- 1889: Pousse-pousse, one-act review by Louis Battaille et Julien Sermet, at la Scala (1 December)
- 1890: Bob et son pion, one-act vaudeville by Louis Battaille and Julien Sermet, at la Scala (4 October)
- 1891: Les Paris de Paris, fantasy review of the year 1890 in 1 act and 3 scenes by Louis Battaille and Julien Sermet, at la Scala (8 January)
- 1891: Les Surprises du Carnaval, one-act folie carnavalesque by Eugène Hugot, at la Scala (7 February)
- 1892: Blagsonn and C^{o}, fantaisie acrobatique by Paul Meyan and Arthur Verneuil at La Scala (2 April)
- 1892: Mon camarade, vaudeville by Louis Battaille and Julien Sermet, at La Scala (12 November)
- 1892: Cambriolons, review of the year 1892 by Louis Battaille and Julien Sermet, at la Scala (23 December)
- 1893: Lysistata, review in 2 acts and 7 scenes by Louis Battaille and Julien Sermet, at La Scala (8 April) then at the Concert de Ba-Ta-Clan (5 May)
- 1893: A la papa, review in 2 acts and 4 scenes by Armand Numès and Julien Sermet, at the Eldorado (4 October)
- 1894: Chadi, one-act bouffonnerie by Raoul Donval, at the Eldorado (3 February)
- 1895: L'Ile d'amour, one-act pantomime by Léon Garnier, at the Concert de Ba-Ta-Clan (14 December)
- 1896: Paris-Revue, review in 4 scenes by Léon Garnier and Fernand Beissier at the Bataclan (23 January)
- 1896: La Queue du diable, fantastic play in 2 acts by Léon Garnier and Eugène Héros, at the Ba-Ta-Clan (16 October)
- 1896: Les Protocoleries de l'année, review in 2 acts and 6 scenes by Victor de Cottens and Paul Gavault, at the Ba-Ta-Clan (26 November)
- 1897: La Tziganie dans les ménages, folie carnavalesque in 1 act and 2 scenes by Eugène Héros and Adolphe Jost, at the Ba-Ta-Clan (23 March)
- 1902: La Revue des Folies-Bergère, review in 14 scenes by Victor de Cottens, at the Folies-Bergère (31 December)
- 1906: La Revue des Folies-Bergère, féerie-review in 14 scenes by Victor de Cottens, at the Folies-Bergère (15 December)
- 1907: Pretty Madge, fantaisy in 6 scenes by Léon Gandillot and Joseph Leroux, at the Folies-Bergère (2 April)
- 1907: La Revue des Folies-Bergère, review in 17 scenes by P.-L. Flers, at the Folies-Bergère (23 December)
- 1908: La Revue des Folies-Bergère, French-English review in 25 scenes by P.-L. Flers, at the Folies-Bergère (5 December)
- 1909: La Revue des Folies-Bergère, review in 31 scenes by P.-L. Flers and Eugène Héros, at the Folies-Bergère (5 December)
- 1915: Jusqu'au bout !, great winter review in 25 scenes by Georges Arnould, at the Folies-Bergère (31 December)

Ballet music

- 1901: La Tzigane, two-acts pantomime by Staw, choreography by Mariquita, at the Folies-Bergère (8 May)
- 1901: Une Noce auvergnate, ballet, choreography by Mariquita, at the Folies-Bergère (13 September)

== Awards ==
- Officier d'Académie (arrêté du ministre de l'Instruction publique et des Beaux-Arts du 31 décembre 1904).
- Officier de l'Instruction publique (arrêté du ministre de l'Instruction publique et des Beaux-Arts du 27 novembre 1909).
