= Zélie Hadamard =

French actress

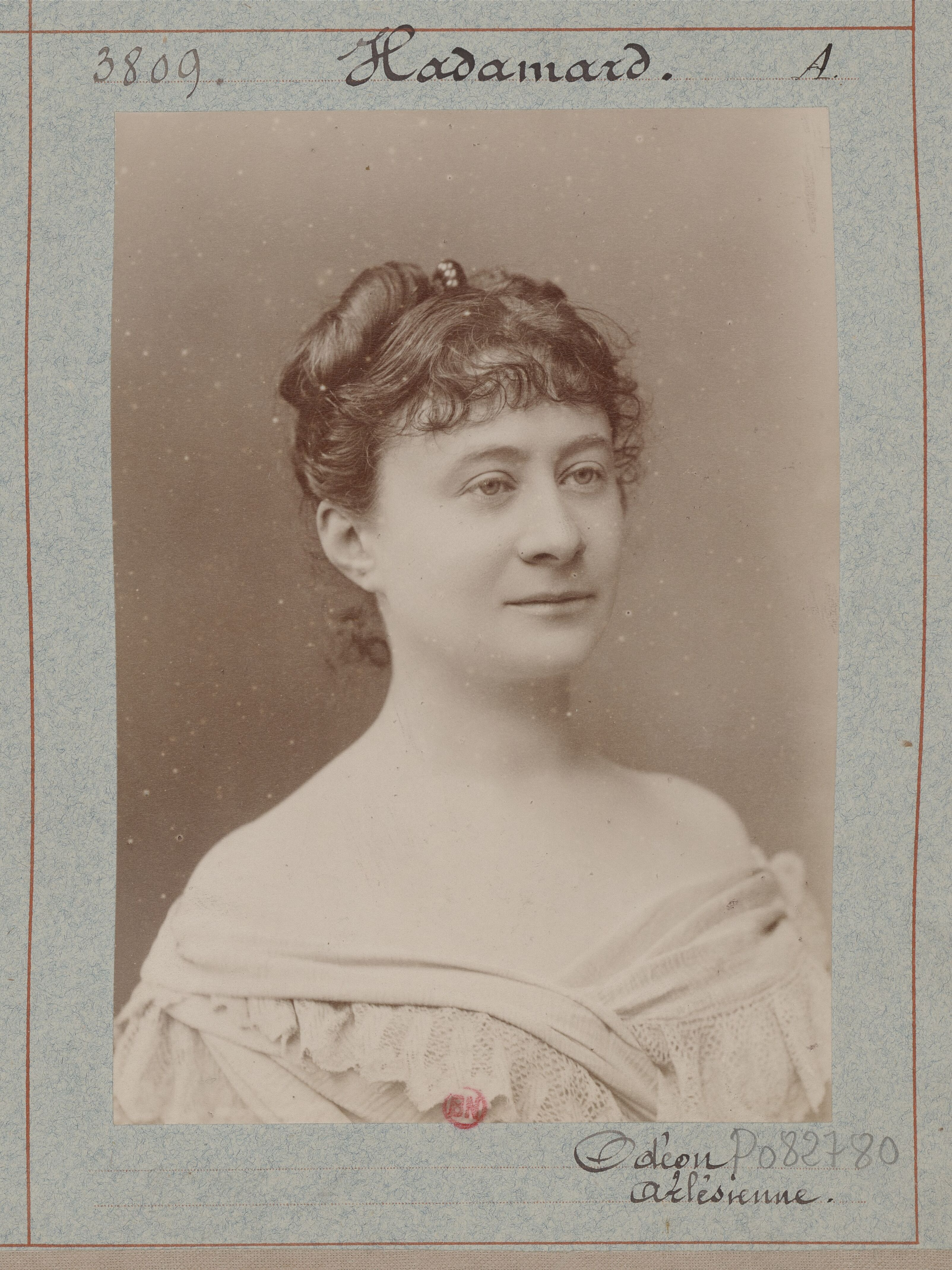
- Zélie Hadamard in L'Arlésienne (1885)
- Born: September 30, 1849; Oran, French Algeria
- Died: October 5, 1902 (aged 53); Paris, France
- Burial place: Montparnasse Cemetery

Zélie Hadamard (September 30, 1849 – October 5, 1902) was a French actress.

== Biography ==
Zélie Hadamard was born into a Jewish family in Oran, Algeria, in 1849. Her father, David Hadamard, was a noted Arabist who died when she was six weeks old. Her first cousin was mathematician Jacques Hadamard, and her uncle was painter Auguste Hadamard.

She went to Paris and passed at the Conservatoire, where she studied under tragedian Pierre-François Beauvallet. She made her stage début at the Odéon. After playing in Brussels and Rouen she returned to Paris, where she appeared at several theatres. At the Odéon, and later the Comédie-Française, she filled and created many important parts, especially in classic tragedy.

She died in October 1902 due to complications from surgery, at the age of 53.

== Roles ==
- 1879: Mademoiselle Danton in Camille Desmoulins by Emile Moreau
- 1879: Sabine in Gros bonnets de Krœhwinckel by Kotzebue, translated by Gustave Bertrand
- 1879: Fleur de lys and Esmeralda in Notre-Dame de Paris by Paul Foucher, adapted from Victor Hugo's The Hunchback of Notre-Dame
- 1879: Martha in L'Inquisition by Gélis
- 1880: Andrée in Les Mouchards by Jules Moinaux and Paul Parfait
- 1882: Louise Baudoin in L'Incendiaire by Benjamin Antier and Alexis Decomberousse
- 1882: Cécile Tussaud in La grande Iza by Alexis Bouvier and William Bertrand Busnach
- 1882: Mimi in La vie de Bohême
- 1883: Adrienne de Reuilly in Le mariage d'André by Hippolyte Lemaire and Philippe Rouvre
- 1883: Mademoiselle de Romanet in Le mariage de Racine by Guillaume Livet and Gustave Vautrey
- 1883: Phèdre in Phèdre by Jean Racine
- 1885: Vivette in L'Arlésienne by Alphonse Daudet
- 1887: Andromaque by Jean Racine
