= Vautrey =

Vautrey is a surname. Notable people with the surname include:

- Gustave Vautrey (1855–1923), French poet
- Richard Vautrey, British doctor
