= Trébla =

Albert Delvaille, called Trébla (Neuilly-sur-Seine, 30 May 1870 – Paris, October 1943) was a French playwright and novelist.

After he finished his studies at École Monge, he joined his father at Sète where he had his first play presented. He was then just 15. After he returned in Paris, his plays were given on numerous stages including the Théâtre Antoine, La Cigale or the Bataclan.

He is buried at the Montmartre Cemetery (3rd division).

== Works ==
- Le Médecin vétérinaire, vaudeville in 1 act, 1885
- Le Harem de Pontarlier, maraboulerie in 1 act, with Carin, music by Laurent Halet, 1897
- Elle !, drame réaliste in 1 act, with John Croisier, 1898
- Personne !, comedy in 1 act, 1899
- Un Amant de cœur, comédie-pantalonnade in 1 act, with Léon Garnier, 1900
- L'Amour en fantaisies, 1900
- Cornarville, one-act play, with Jean Lavaur, 1900
- Les Joyeux chauffeurs, ou le Jeu de l'auto, one-act play, with Carin, 1900
- Napoléglon, one-act play and 3 tableaux, with Blount, 1900
- Nostalgie, drama in 1 act, with Eugène Héros, 1900
- Une Actualité sensationnelle, comedy in 1 act, with Henry de Forge, 1900
- La Grève des couturières, vaudeville in 1 act, with Blount, 1901
- Claudine en vadrouille, play in 4 tableaux, music by Laurent Halet, 1902
- Cendrillette ou la culotte merveilleuse, play in 2 acts and 2 tableaux, with René Schwaeblé, 1903
- Le 68e Plongeurs à cheval, fantaisie-opérette in 2 acts, with Harry Blount, 1904
- Agitons nos gambettes, fantaisie in 1 act, 1904
- Mariage et photographie, vaudeville in 1 act, 1904
- Restaurant pour dames (Ladies' house), one-act play, with Edmond Char, 1904
- La Corde, one-act play, with Coquiot, 1905
- Maison Bonnard et Legrenay, drama in 1 act, 1905
- La Guêpe, comédie dramatique in 1 act, with Coquiot, 1906
- Les Treize jours de Laburette, one-act play in 1 act and 1 tableau, 1906
- La Belle et la bonne, vaudeville in 1 act, with Peter Carin, 1907
- Coco-Chéri, operetta in 2 acts and 4 tableaux, with Codey, music by François Perpignan, 1907
- Dans les vieux pots, comedy in 1 act, with Héros, 1907
- Vive la République !, one-act play, with Coquiot, 1907
- L'Ami de la justice, comedy in 1 act, with Gustave Coquiot, 1908
- Ali-Bébé ou les Quarante voleuses, operetta in 2 acts and 4 tableaux, with Émile Codey, music by Gustave Goublier, 1909
- La Petite Poison, with Codey, 1909
- Le Plus beau corps de France, military fantasy in 2 acts and 5 tableaux, with Codey, 1910
- Des Mots, des phrases, 1918
- Caille sur canapé, one-act play, with Marc Sonal, 1920
- Madame la vie, 1920
- Chez les Clapet, saynète, 1921
- Les Femmes des amis, c'est sacré ! ou le Cocu débonnaire, 1924
- Une Maison où l'on cause, one-act play, 1924
- J'veux pas rester vieille fille, novel, with Lyonel Robert, 1925
- Pactaquate, 1935
- 2 de Marseille, with Sonal, 1937
- L'Héritière de Courmelon, one-act play, with Sonal, 1938
- Un Mouchoir à la fenêtre, sketch radiophonique, 1938
- Un Seul amour, comedy in 1 act, with Sonal, 1938

== Bibliography ==
- Isidore Singer, Cyrus Adler, The Jewish encyclopedia, a descriptive record of the history, religion, literature, and customs of the Jewish people from the earliest times to the present day, vol.4, 1925, p. 509
