= The Agony of the Eagles =

The Agony of the Eagles (French:L'agonie des aigles) may refer to:

- The Agony of the Eagles (1922 film), a French silent film directed by Julien Duvivier
- The Agony of the Eagles (1933 film), a French film directed by Roger Richebé
- The Agony of the Eagles (1952 film), a French film directed by Jean Alden-Delos
