= Première rhapsodie =

1910 piece for accompanied clarinet by Claude Debussy

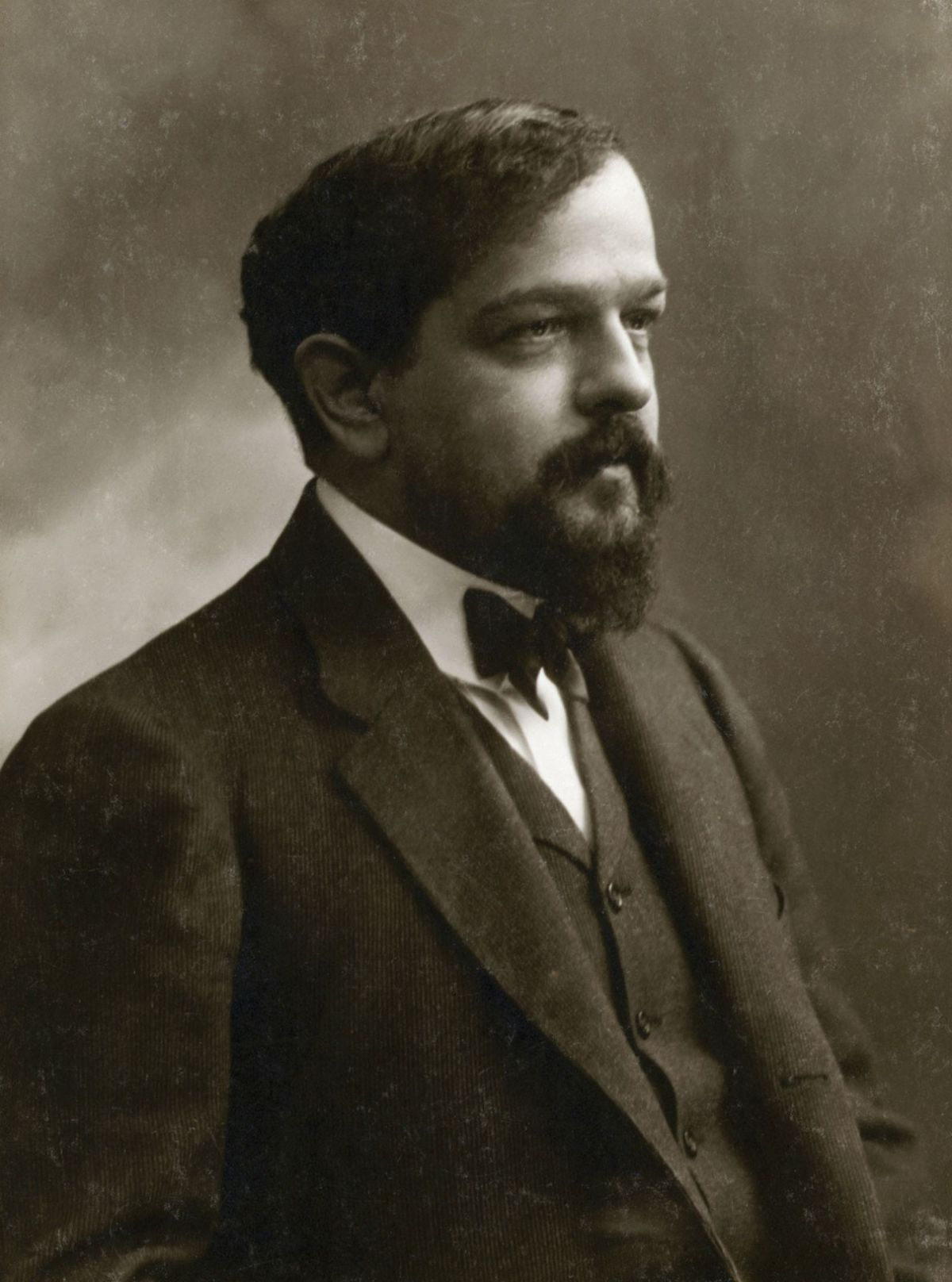
Claude Debussy ca. 1908

The Première rhapsodie (First Rhapsody), L. 116, CD. 124, by Claude Debussy is a piece for accompanied clarinet. Composed between December 1909 and January 1910, it was dedicated to the French clarinet professor Prosper Mimart.

In 1909, Gabriel Fauré, Director of the Conservatoire de Paris, named Debussy to its board of directors (le Conseil Supérieur). One of Debussy's first duties was to supply two works for the next year's clarinet examinations. The Rhapsodie was first performed as part of the examinations on July 14, 1910. The original composition was for clarinet and piano; Debussy published his own orchestration of the accompaniment in 1911, after the official premiere with Mimart.

In 1901, Debussy had been commissioned to write a work for alto saxophone and orchestra by Elise Hall, but never finished the 1903 draft during his lifetime. This "Second Rhapsody" was later completed by Jean Roger-Ducasse as Rapsodie pour orchestre et saxophone.
