= Eugène Héros =

French playwright and chansonnier (1860–1925)

- Born: 14 August 1860; Paris
- Died: 11 December 1925 (aged 65); Paris
- Occupations: Playwright, chansonnier

Eugène Héros (14 August 1860 – 11 December 1925) was a French playwright and chansonnier.

== Biography ==
A lawyer and member of Le Chat noir, he collaborated among others to Le Figaro and to La France and became managing director of the Théâtre du Palais Royal (1907-1910) then of the Scala (1914-1918). His plays were presented on the most important Parisian stages of the 19th and begin of the 20th century including the Théâtre des Variétés, the Théâtre de Cluny, the Palais Royal, the Théâtre de la Renaissance, the Bataclan, and Bobino.

A founder of the magazine Le Gueux (1891-1892), several of his songs were published in La Rampe and Gil-Blas illustrated, from 1892 to 1900. They were performed among others by Jean Sablon or Jeannette Levasseur.

== Works ==
Theatre

- La Noce à Génie, 1885
- Il a des bottes !, revue in 3 tableaux, with Georges Bertal, 1888
- En livrée, vaudeville in 1 act, with Achille Mélandri, 1889
- Le Roi Claquette, operetta in 1 act, music by Félix Chaudoir, 1890
- Les Étrennes de M. Trouillard, folie-opérette in 1 act, music by Gangloff, 1891
- Le Fils de Madame Blum, monologue, 1891
- La Partie de baccara, comédie-vaudeville in 1 act, 1891
- L'Héritier, opérette-bouffe in 1 act, music by Gangloff, 1892
- Leur bonheur !, comédie-vaudeville in 1 act, with Georges Mathieu, 1895
- La Tziganie dans les ménages, play in 1 act and 2 tableaux, with Adolphe Jost, 1897
- Qui va à la chasse, operetta in 1 act, with Alfred Delilia, music by Duhem, 1898
- Nostalgie, drama in 1 act, with Trébla, 1900
- Sa Crotte !, comédie-vaudeville in 1 act, with Harry Blount, 1900
- Fleurissez-vous, Mesdames !, with Gavault, 1901
- Le Pont d'Avignon, comédie-vaudeville, with Noël Villiers, 1902
- Le Cartel, comédie-vaudeville in 1 act, 1902
- Chez qui ?, revue-féerie in 1 act and 2 Tableaux, 1902
- Family-Hôtel, vaudeville in 3 acts, with Paul Gavault and Eugène Millou, 1902
- Reims s'expose, revue in 1 acti and 3 Tableaux, 1903
- Veinard !, vaudeville-opérette in 2 acts and 5 tableaux, 1904
- Le Chasseur de canards, comedy in 1 act, 1905
- Don Juan moderne, vaudeville in 1 act, 1905
- Pâquerette, one-act play, with Léon Abric, 1905
- Il est ignoble avec Bouchard !, vaudeville in 1 act, 1906
- Les Suites d'un premier mai, vaudeville in 1 act, with Flers, 1906
- La Veuve, one-act play, with Abric, 1906
- La Revue du centenaire, with Flers, music by Alfred Fock, 1907
- Ah ! Moumoute !, folie-opérette in 2 acts and 6 tableaux, with P.-L. Flers, 1907
- Dans les vieux pots, comedy in 1 act, with Trébla, 1907
- Salu...e !, revue in 2 acts and 8 tableaux, with Flers, 1907
- Les Tribulations d'un gendre, 1908
- A l'Alcazar... de la fourchette, drama extravaganza in 4 tableaux, undated
- L'Arbitre, saynète comique, with Léon Garnier, undated
- Le Coup du gendarme, pantomime, undated
- La Femme sans bras, monologue, with Ernest Gerny, undated
- Paris-Boycotte, revue in 2 acts and 5 tableaux, undated
- La Revue roulante, in 2 acts and 4 tableaux, undated
- Le Circuit du Ceste, opérette revue féerie vaudeville in 2 acts and 17 tableaux, with Flers, undated
- Penses tu !, revue in 2 acts and 8 tableaux, undated

Songs

- Mon p'tit Salé, berceuse argotique, music by Henri Chatau, 1891
- Ah ! c' que j' m'embête !, music by Léopold Gangloff, 1892
- Ballade du ventre, song, music by Henri Albertini, 1892
- Les trois Chemises !, song, music by Gangloff, 1892
- Les Bibis !, music by Gangloff, 1892
- Les Pousse-cailloux !, music by Gangloff, 1893
- Çà vous coûte si peu !, song, music by Gangloff, 1894
- La Cigarière, Spanish song, music by Eugène Dédé fils, 1894
- Libre Échange !, song, music by Fragson, 1894
- Lingaling, chansonnette, music by Eugène Dédé fils, 1894
- La Prière du gueux !, poem by Eugène Héros, incidental music by Léopold Gangloff, 1894
- Nos Parents !, histoire biblique, music by Gangloff, 1895
- La Rosse, song, music arranged by Jules Lasaïgues, after the English song La Didily Idily de C.-M. Rodney, 1895
- Ah ! Viens !, chanson valse, music by Ernest Gillet, 1896
- Contrastes !, song, music by Ernest Lerwile, 1896
- La Michonnette, music by Paul Delmet, 1896
- Pik et Ponk et Poo !, chanson-scie tirée de l'anglais, lyrics by Eugène Héros, music arranged by Gaston Maquis, 1896
- La Queue du diable, pièce fantastique in 2 acts, with Léon Garnier, 1896
- Ce qu'elles coûtent !, chansonnette comiques, music by Félix Chaudoir, 1897
- Revanche !, music by Jean Varney, 1897
- Les Honnêtes Gens !, song, music by Harry Fragson, 1897
- Paris-London !, monologue song, music by Fragson, 1897
- L'Ange, music by Émile Duhem, 1898
- Vision !, mélodie, poem by Eugène Héros, music by André Pradels, 1898
- Voyage de noces, rondeau, music by Émile Bonnamy, 1898
- Toutes les mêmes !, music by Félicien Vargues, 1899
- Les Huit Reflets !, chansonnette, music by Émile Spencer, 1900
- Premier Baiser !, valse chantée sur les motifs de l'Ange qui passe, lyrics by Eugène Héros, music by William Salabert, 1900
- Viv' l'Exposition !, music by William, 1900
- Laissez glaner !, music by Gustave Goublier, 1901
- Inutile Beauté !, poem by Eugène Héros, music by Paul Fauchey, 1902
- Ludo Ratz. Je ne veux pas !, valse chantée, music by Louis Bernard-Saraz, 1902
- Jeu de Massacre !, chansonnette, lyrics by Eugène Héros and Jean Varney, music by Émile Lassailly, 1902
- Tout passe !, valse chantée, lyrics by Paul Gavault and Eugène Héros, music by Rodolphe Berger, 1902
- Avec difficile !, valse chantée, poem by Eugène Héros, music by Paul Fauchey, 1903
- J'ai trois Fleurs dans mon jardin !, poem by Eugène Héros, music by Louis Auguin, 1903
- Le Pisteur !, chansonnette, music by Bertrand Diodet, 1903
- La Bien-aimée !, valse chantée, music by Paul Wachs, 1904
- L'Amour obligatoire, chansonnette, after the American march Anona by Vivian Grey, lyrics by P.-L. Flers et Heros, music arranged by Charles Thony, 1906
- Margotin marche, song on the motives of The British Patrol by G. Ash, lyrics by Héros and André Mauprey, music by Mauprey and Thony, 1906
- Baisers fleuris, valse, poem by Eugène Heros, music by Youssef Khan Nazare-Aga, 1908
- Hop ! eh ! ah ! di ! ohe !, popular song, with Flers, music by Auguste Bosc, 1910
- Bal du Moulin Rouge, undated
- Pourquoi ne pas m'aimer ?, valse chantée sur les motifs de la Valse bleue (sans accords), music by Alfred Margis, undated
- P'tit cochon, music by Fragson, undated

Autres

- Le Brésil à l'Exposition universelle de 1889, with Alfred Marchand, 1889
- Suppression de l'Assistance publique, 1890
- La Grosse Marie, 1896
- Les Lyriques, poems, 1898
- Le Théâtre du Palais Royal de la Montansier à la fin du siècle. Notes et souvenirs, 1901
- Le Théâtre anecdotique, petites histoires de théâtre, foreword by Tristan Bernard and Paul Gavault, 1912
- Les Parodies, undated

== Bibliography ==
- Revue des lectures, vol.14, 1926, (p. 194) (obituary)
- Russell Parsons Jameson, Rire et sourire, 1926,(p. 19)
- Serge Dillaz, La Chanson sous la troisième République, 1991 (p. 267)
