= Raphaël Adam =

Raphaël Adam may refer to:

- Raphaël Adam (playwright)
- Raphaël Adam (politician)
