= Hérouard =

Hérouard or Herouard is a surname. Notable people with the surname include:

- Antoine Hérouard (born 1956), French bishop
- Célestin Marcel Hérouard (1833–1888), French politician
- Chéri Hérouard (1881–1961), French illustrator
- Dominique Fauré-Hérouard (1851–1927), French politician
- Edgard Hérouard (1858–1932), French marine biologist
- Lucien Hérouard (1921–2004), French association football player

== See also ==
- Thibouville-Herouard, former brand name of Cabart musical instruments
