= Georges Longy =

French musician (1868–1930)

Georges Longy (1868 – 1930) was a French-born oboist, conductor and composer. He is the founder of Longy School of Music.

== Personal life ==
Longy was born in Abbeville, France on August 29, 1868. He trained at Paris Conservatoire with Georges Gillet, where by the age of 18 he was awarded the first prize for oboe. He spent the majority of his career with the Boston Symphony Orchestra ('BSO'), and, after 27 years with them, Longy retired so that he could spend time on his farm in France. In the last five years of Longy's life he no longer continued to play the oboe, but instead turned his attention to looking after his two hundred head of cattle and poultry. Longy died on his farm in 1930. Six months later the BSO honored Longy with a memorial concert on November 3, 1930.

== Career ==
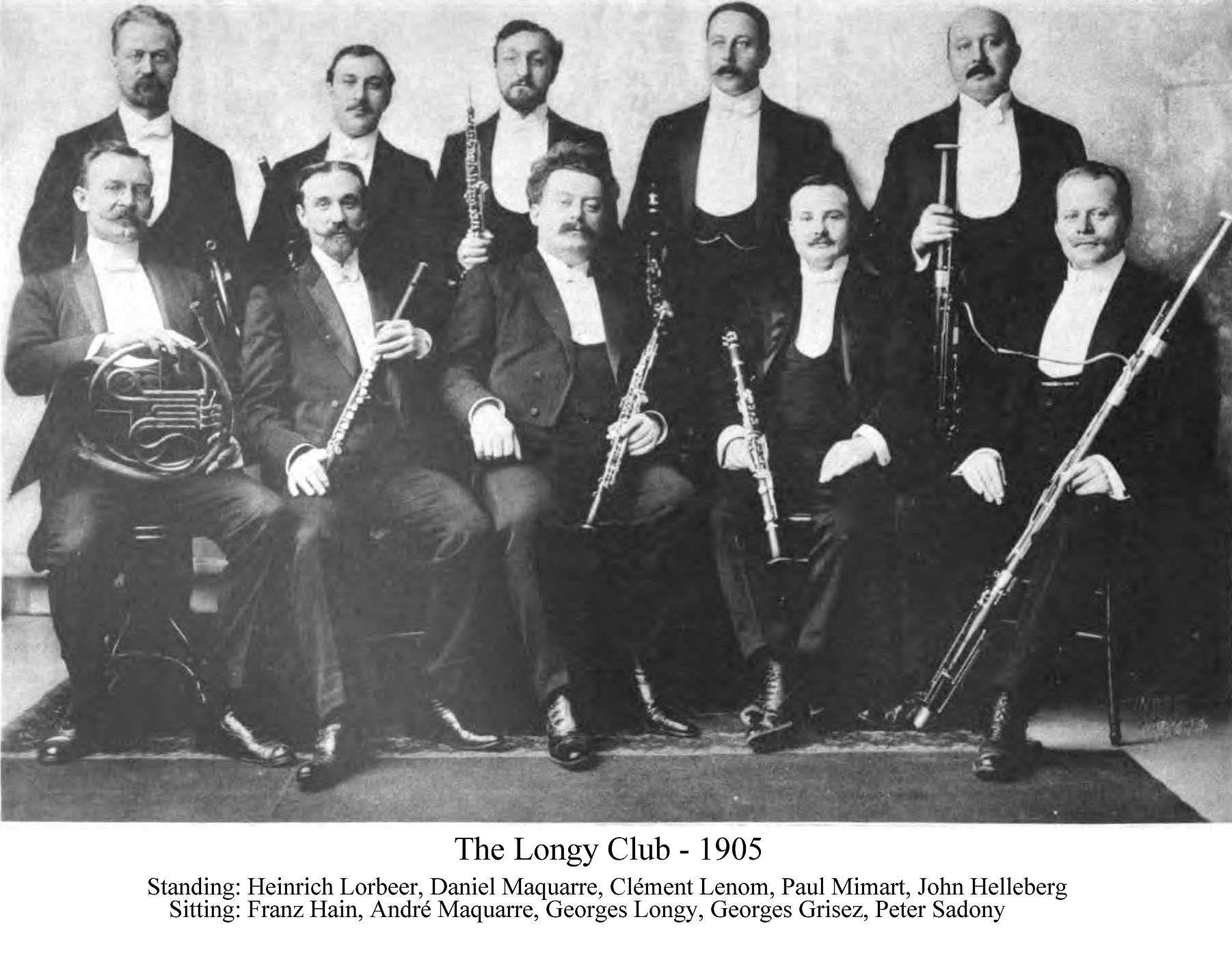
The Longy Club 1905

Longy started his career as an oboist in Europe where he played with such orchestras as the Lamoureux and the Colonne. In 1895 Longy tried to restore the Société de Musique de Chambre pour Instruments à Vent, an influential Parisian chamber group that had disbanded. In 1898, the Boston Symphony Orchestra called on him to fill the position of principal oboist in that ensemble. Longy founded a number of instrumental groups during his years in Boston. These included The New York Chamber Music Association in 1913, The Boston Orchestral Club in 1899 with his friend Elise Hall, and the distinguished wind ensemble known as the Longy Club (1900-1917). From 1899 to 1911 he conducted The Boston Orchestral Club, The MacDowell Club Orchestra (1915 – 1925) and The Cecilia Society (1916).

The Société de Musique de Chambre pour Instruments à Vent ("Society of Chamber Music for Wind Instruments") was an important chamber group established in 1879 in France. It promoted and commissioned new music for wind instruments. When the group came to an end in 1895, Georges Longy tried to reestablish the group with clarinetist Prosper Mimart, but it only lasted for a short period of time, as Longy had moved to Boston by 1898. In 1900 Longy took his experience in France and applied it to found the Longy Club. This lasted seventeen years, and allowed the Boston audiences to hear French works as well as newer music composed particularly for the club, which was a significant presence on the Boston musical scene.

Georges Longy was a gifted oboist, consistently praised by his peers for his abilities. In 1915 during a performance with the BSO, Fritz Kreisler became "captivated by the perfection of Mr. Longy's great art...[and] became so absorbed that he missed his entrance."

== Legacy ==
Olin Downes, a music critic for The New York Times, said that "Longy probably influenced the musical life of Boston more than any other one man".

Longy used the many positions that he held in the groups that he worked with to premier new French music to the Boston public. He premiered composers such as Saint-Saëns, Debussy, Berlioz, Hahn and D'Indy in America and brought a new wave of French music to the United States. In 1915 Longy created the Longy School of Music to bring the French style of teaching to the Boston community. Georges Longy left the Longy School in the hands of his daughter Renée Longy-Miquelle after he retired to France. Longy championed chamber music, and his legacy is felt by the city of Boston to this day.
