= Hadamard (disambiguation) =

Hadamard may refer to:

- Zélie Hadamard (1849–1901), French actress
- Jacques Hadamard (1865–1963), a French mathematician
  - List of things named after Jacques Hadamard
