= Léon Garnier =

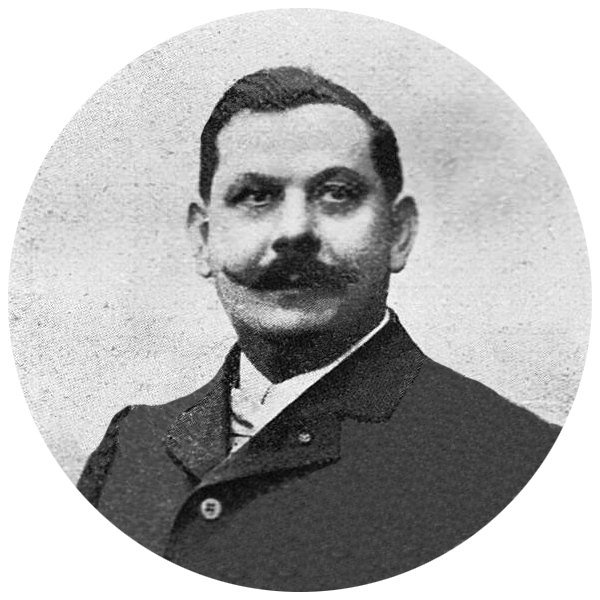
Léon Garnier

Léon Garnier (1856 in Lyon – 1905 in Meung-sur-Loire (Loiret)) was a French 19th-century composer and lyricist.

Garnier wrote numerous songs with Lucien Delormel, and particularly two songs, created by Paulus, which were met with enormous success in their time, En revenant de la revue and Le Père la Victoire.

== Works (selection) ==
- Le Lendemain matin, chansonnette, lyrics and music by Delormel and Garnier, 1884
- À trente-cinq ans, chansonnette, lyrics and music by Delormel and Garnier, 1885
- De c'côté-ci, de c'côté-là !, chansonnette, lyrics and music by Delormel and Garnier, 1885
- En v'nant de Montmorency, chanson, lyrics and music by Delormel and Garnier, 1885
- La Montre en argent, chansonnette, lyrics and music by Delormel and Garnier, 1885

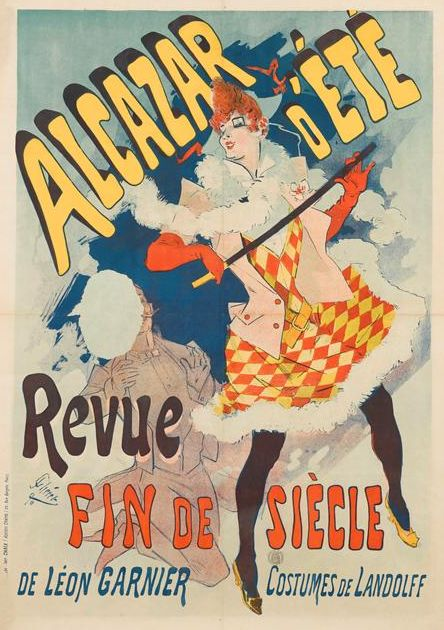
Alcazar d'été, revue fin de siècle de Léon Garnier by Jules Chéret

- Exploits d'huissier, monologue by Garnier and Charles-Albert d'Appy, 1885
- Le Signe de la croix and Ah ! qu'j'ai mal au pied, 2 monologues comiques by Garnier and d'Appy, 1885
- Briscard et Pitou, duo-bouffe, lyrics by Garnier and d'Appy, music by Léopold Gangloff, 1886
- En revenant de la revue, lyrics by Delormel and Garnier, music by Louis-César Desormes, 1886
- Je vends du Kina-Tarascon, monologue, lyrics by Delormel and Garnier, répertoire Paulus, 1887
- Le Père la Victoire, lyrics by Delormel and Garnier, music by Louis Ganne, répertoire Paulus, 1888
- Adrien et Galimard, chansonnette comique, lyrics and music by Delormel and Garnier, 1888
- Le Billet de cinq-cent francs, chansonnette, lyrics and music by Delormel and Garnier, 1888
- Le Bureau des naissances, chansonnette-monologue, lyrics and music by Delormel and Garnier, 1888
- Le Gueusard de Fouinard !, chansonnette comique, lyrics and music by Delormel and Garnier, 1888
- Je n'marche pas, chansonnette, lyrics and music by Delormel and Garnier, 1888
- Mon ami Poireau, chansonnette comique, lyrics and music by Delormel and Garnier, 1888
- Mon billet de faveur, chansonnette comique, lyrics and music by Delormel and Garnier, 1888
- Mon gosse, chansonnette comique, lyrics and music by Delormel and Garnier, 1888
- La Pièce militaire, chansonnette, lyrics and music by Delormel and Garnier, 1888
- Ah ! non… j'vas r'miser, chansonnette, lyrics and music by Delormel and Garnier, 1889
- Argent à placer, chansonnette comique, lyrics and music by Delormel and Garnier, 1889
- Bœuf à l'huile, chansonnette comique, lyrics and music by Delormel and Garnier, 1889
- Dégouté des pochards, scène comique avec parlé, lyrics and music by Delormel and Garnier, 1889
- Les Déménagements d'Ugène, grande chansonnette comique, lyrics and music by Delormel and Garnier, 1889
- Le Départ du tapin, romance comique, lyrics and music by Delormel and Garnier, 1889
- Une femme discrète, chansonnette comique, lyrics and music by Delormel and Garnier, 1889
- Un homme méfiant, chansonnette, lyrics and music by Delormel and Garnier, 1889
- L'Invalide de Marseille, monologue comique, lyrics and music by Delormel and Garnier, 1889
- Le Journal bien informé, scène comique. lyrics and music by Delormel and Garnier, 1889
- Priez pour elle, chansonnette comique, lyrics and music by Delormel and Garnier, 1889
- Si j'étais député !, grande scène comique à parlé, lyrics and music by Delormel and Garnier, 1889
- Le Tribunal comique, scène comique. lyrics and music by Delormel and Garnier, 1889
- Vole, vole, mon cœur vole, chansonnette comique, lyrics and music by Delormel and Garnier, 1889
- Y'a plus moyen d'rigoler, grande scène comique, lyrics and music by Delormel and Garnier, 1889
- À Mèzidon, chansonnette comique, lyrics and music by Delormel and Garnier, 1890
- L'Alphabet comique, rondeau, lyrics and music by Delormel and Garnier, 1890
- Les Bonnes à Bitard, scène comique, lyrics and music by Delormel and Garnier, 1890
- C'est un fin de siècle, chansonnette, lyrics and music by Delormel and Garnier, 1890
- Chez le commissaire, scène comique, lyrics and music by Delormel and Garnier, 1890
- La Création de Nini, chansonnette, lyrics and music by Delormel and Garnier, 1890
- De profondis, chansonnette comique, lyrics and music by Delormel and Garnier, 1890
- La Famille Beaucaillou, chansonnette, lyrics and music by Delormel and Garnier, 1890
- La Fille à Taupin, chansonnette comique. lyrics and music by Delormel and Garnier, 1890
- Gigolette, chansonnette, lyrics and music by Delormel and Garnier, 1890
- L'Homme aux 36 métiers, scène comique, lyrics and music by Delormel and Garnier, 1890
- L'Homme proverbe, scène comique, lyrics and music by Delormel and Garnier, 1890
- Jeanne m'a pris mon irrigateur, romance comique, lyrics and music by Delormel and Garnier, 1890
- Les Mardis de ma femme, scène comique à parlé, lyrics and music by Delormel and Garnier, 1890
- Montpernasse, chansonnette comique, lyrics and music by Delormel and Garnier, 1890
- Nos artistes, chansonnette, lyrics and music by Delormel and Garnier, 1890
- Oui p'pa, oui m'man, chansonnette comique, lyrics and music by Delormel and Garnier, 1890
- Le Rembrandt de Landerneau, chansonnette, lyrics and music by Delormel and Garnier, 1890
- Taupin chez la Marquise, chansonnette comique, lyrics and music by Delormel and Garnier, 1890
- Le Tonneau de l'épicier, chanson, monologue, lyrics and music by Delormel and Garnier, 1890
- La Valse des bas noirs, song written with Gaston Maquis, (1890 ?)
- Alcazar d'été, revue fin de siècle by Léon Garnier, 1890
- Ça manque de femmes, chansonnette, lyrics and music by Delormel and Garnier, 1891
- Le Chien de la cocotte, chansonnette, lyrics and music by Delormel and Garnier, 1891
- Le Chien de Montauban, chansonnette, lyrics and music by Delormel and Garnier, 1891
- De Falaise à Paris, chansonnette comique, lyrics and music by Delormel and Garnier, 1891
- Les Débuts de Lapocheté, scène comique, lyrics and music by Delormel and Garnier, 1891
- Et moi z'aussi, chansonnette, lyrics and music by Delormel and Garnier, 1891
- Une femme qui ne vient pas ! monologue, lyrics and music by Delormel and Garnier, 1891
- La Langue d'Ève, chansonnette, lyrics and music by Delormel and Garnier, 1891
- Une leçon d'argot, chansonnette, lyrics and music by Delormel and Garnier, 1891
- Lohengrin, chansonnette comique, lyrics and music by Delormel and Garnier, 1891
- Ma petite Antoinette, chansonnette comique, lyrics and music by Delormel and Garnier, 1891
- Mine, qu'il est à la coule !, scène comique, lyrics and music by Delormel and Garnier, 1891
- L'Omnibus de l'Odéon, chansonnette, lyrics and music by Delormel and Garnier, 1891
- Le Pochard fin de siècle, scène comique, lyrics and music by Delormel and Garnier, 1891
- Roman d'amour, chanson fin de siècle, lyrics and music by Delormel and Garnier, 1891
- Samson et Dalila, complainte comique, lyrics and music by Delormel and Garnier, 1891
- Le Soliste, chansonnette-monologue, lyrics and music by Delormel and Garnier, 1891
- Les Suicides d'Oscar, scène comique, lyrics and music by Delormel and Garnier, 1891
- Tous en grève, chansonnette, lyrics and music by Delormel and Garnier, 1891
- Trop gras, chansonnette, lyrics and music by Delormel and Garnier, 1891
- Le Tuyau !, scie, lyrics and music by Delormel and Garnier, 1891
- Le Bébé de la boulangère, chansonnette, lyrics and music by Delormel and Garnier, 1892
- Dix-neuf-vingt-cinq, chansonnette, lyrics and music by Delormel and Garnier, 1892
- La Femme tatouée, chansonnette comique, lyrics and music by Delormel and Garnier, 1892
- Les Five o'clock de Théodore, scène comique, lyrics and music by Delormel and Garnier, 1892
- L'Homme tatoué, chanson comique, lyrics and music by Delormel and Garnier, 1892
- Les Impôts, monologue, lyrics and music by Delormel and Garnier, 1892
- L'Interview du poivrot, chansonnette, lyrics and music by Delormel and Garnier, 1892
- Ma sœur Angèle, chansonnette, lyrics and music by Delormel and Garnier, 1892
- Le Poivrot de Laricot, scène comique, lyrics and music by Delormel and Garnier, 1892
- Priez pour eux !, complainte comique, lyrics and music by Delormel and Garnier, 1892
- Quand on voit ça !, chansonnette, lyrics and music by Delormel and Garnier, 1892
- Rigolard et Pleurnichard, chansonnette, lyrics and music by Delormel and Garnier, 1892
- Le Séminariste, chansonnette, lyrics and music by Delormel and Garnier, 1892
- La Sentinelle rageuse, chansonnette comique, lyrics and music by Delormel and Garnier, 1892
- Les Souvenirs d'Alphonse, romance naturaliste, lyrics and music by Delormel and Garnier, 1892
- Le Zéro, chansonnette, lyrics and music by Delormel and Garnier, 1892
- Le Cocher syndiqué, chansonnette, lyrics and music by Delormel and Garnier, 1893
- La Licence des grues, chansonnette, lyrics by Delormel and Garnier, 1893
- La Maison de campagne, scène a parlé, lyrics and music by Delormel and Garnier, 1893
- Le Régisseur, grande scène à parlé, lyrics and music by Delormel and Garnier, 1893
- Les Rêves de Nez-sale, scène à parlé, lyrics and music by Delormel and Garnier, 1893
- T'as raison !, chansonnette, lyrics and music by Delormel and Garnier, 1893
- Le Travail de huit heures, chansonnette, lyrics and music by Delormel and Garnier, 1893
- Qui veut des plumes de paon ? ou Zizi pan pan, chansonnette, lyrics and music by Delormel and Garnier, 1893
- Une conquête militaire, chansonnette, lyrics and music by Delormel and Garnier, 1894
- Dialogue nocturne, monologue, lyrics and music by Delormel and Garnier, 1894
- Le Lapin calculateur, monologue, lyrics by Delormel and Garnier, 1894
- J'aime Cunégonde, monologue, lyrics by Delormel and Garnier, 1894
- Le Potache épaté, monologue, lyrics by Delormel and Garnier, 1894
- Les Enfants de Martinet, grande scène à parlé, lyrics and music by Delormel and Garnier, 1894
- Mamzell' Françoise, chansonnette, lyrics and music by Delormel and Garnier, 1894
- Mon frère de lait, chansonnette comique avec parlé, lyrics and music by Delormel and Garnier, 1894
- L'Oublieux, scène comique, lyrics and music by Delormel and Garnier, 1894
- Le Portrait de Margot, lyrics and music by Garnier and Blérigne, 1894
- Le Rôle de l'état, chansonnette, lyrics and music by Delormel and Garnier, 1894
- Vous allez l'entendre, scène comique, lyrics and music by Delormel and Garnier, 1894
- L'Amour à la vapeur, chansonnette, lyrics and music by Battaille, Garnier and Darsay, 1895
- Plus de mémoire ! chansonnette, lyrics and music by Garnier and Jost, 1895
- La Sale Rosse !, chansonnette, lyrics and music by Garnier and Jost, 1895
- Hardi ! les bleus !, épisode des guerres vendéennes, opéra comique in 2 acts by Léon Garnier and Albert Lhoste, music by Justin Clérice, 1895
- La Queue du diable, pièce fantastique in 2 acts, by Léon Garnier and Eugène Héros, music by Alfred Patusset, 1896
- Le Déserteur, chanson, lyrics and music by Garnier, Jost, Ouvrard, 1896
- Les Pilules de Courant d'air, grande scène comique, lyrics by Louis Tournayre, 1898
- Les Sabines, scène comique, lyrics and music by Delormel and Garnier, 1898
- Les Trois Pèlerins, scène comique, lyrics byHenri Darsay and Fabrice Lemon, music by Garnier, 1898
- U. V. D. C., opérette bouffe in 1 act, by Léon Garnier and Henry Drucker, music by Gaston Maquis, 1898
- L'Épingle, lyrics by Garnier and Jeunil, music by Bunel and Garnier, 1900
- La Jambe de Ferdinand, lyrics and music by Garnier, Delattre, Jeunil and Doubis, 1900
- Un Amant de cœur, comédie-pantalonnade in 1 act, with Trébla, 1900
- Les Boyaudiers !, lyrics by Léon Garnier, music by Adolphe Stanislas and Garnier, 1901
- L'Enfant de Puteaux !, lyrics by de Garnier and Arnoudt, music by G. Bunel and Garnier, 1901
- Les Avariétés de l'année, review in 2 acts and 4 tableaux by Léon Garnier, 1901
- Le Responsible, plaidoyer social in 1 act, by Léon Garnier and Édouard Loisel, 1904
- De Paris à Madagascar, revue comique in four big tableaux by Léon Garnier and Fernand Bessier (undated)
