= Joseph Vassivière =

French poet and playwright

Pierre Joseph de Vassivière (23 April 1879, in Bordeaux – after 1933) was a 20th-century French poet and playwright

A lawyer at the Court of Appeal of Paris, he is best known for having received the Prix Caroline Jouffroy-Renault of the Académie Française in 1934 for A fleur d’aile.

== Works ==
- 18992: Tout par l'égoïsme
- 1917: D'Estanzit, ou l'Éminence jaune, one-act comedy, with Gustave Guiches
- 1917: Le Budget de l'amour, one-act comedy, with Raphaël Adam
- 1917: Une Larme de poète, play in verse in 1 act, with Guillaume Livet
- 1917: Le Revenant, drama in 3 acts
- 1918: L'Âme française. Ode à la France
- 1923: La Berceuse de l'Angelus, poetry
- 1923: A fleur d’aile, collection of poems, foreword by Jean Richepin
- 1925: Dans l'ombre, one-act play
- 1828: Anthologie de l'Anti-Chapelle Poétique. Des vers, 100 poèmes à dire ou à mettre en musique
- 1931: La Jeune fille doit-elle rester vierge ?
- 1933: Vague du désir
