= Georges Gillet =

French oboist and music educator (1854–1920)

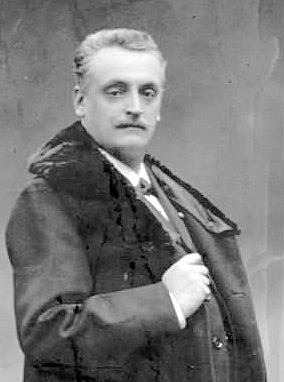
- Gillet in 1900
- Born: May 17, 1854; Louviers
- Died: February 8, 1920 (aged 65); Bessancourt
- Occupations: Oboist, composer

Georges-Vital-Victor Gillet (May 17, 1854 – February 8, 1920) was a French oboist, teacher and composer. In addition to premiering oboe works by prominent French composers of the 19th century, including Émile Paladilhe, Charles-Édouard Lefebvre, Clémence de Grandval, and Camille Saint-Saëns, among others, Gillet was the teacher of Fernand Gillet and Marcel Tabuteau at the Paris Conservatory, helped develop the F. Lorée brand of oboe, and composed a number of études that are still used today.

== Biography ==
Born into a musical family in Louviers on 17 May 1854, Gillet and his brother, cellist and composer, Ernest Gillet (1856–1940) were musical prodigies. Gillet began studying the oboe when he was twelve and, less than a year later, entered the Paris Conservatory to study with Charles Colin. After receiving the premier prix at 15 years old, he graduated in 1869. After graduating, he held oboe positions with the Comédie-Italienne, Concerts Colonne, Orchestre de la Société des Concerts du Conservatoire, Opéra-Comique, and the Paris Opera, as well as a longtime teaching position at the Paris Conservatory from 1881 to 1919. In addition to orchestra and teaching positions, Gillet was a founding member of the Société de Musique de Chambre pour Instruments à Vent (Chamber Music Society for Wind Instruments) with Paul Taffanel, Charles-Paul Turban, and Camille Saint-Saëns which premiered works by Charles Gounod, Lefebvre, Saint-Saëns, and Wolfgang Amadeus Mozart. Gillet was well respected in 19th Century France, with his nephew Fernand later stating that his sound, technique and reed making were "the envy of all". Gillet died February 8, 1920, at the age of 65, and was buried in the Montmartre Cemetery.

== Paris Conservatory ==
Gillet started at the conservatory in October 1881. As a teacher, two of Gillet's notable students were his nephew, Fernand Gillet and Marcel Tabuteau. Tabuteau used his teacher's methods to adapt a new playing style in America. Other students included two principal oboists of the Boston Symphony Orchestra, Albert Weiss and Georges Longy; Alfred Barthel, principal of the Chicago Symphony; Louis Speyer and Alexandre Duvoir. Gillet is credited with introducing vibrato at the Paris Conservatory as well as teaching students to warm up by playing three chromatic scales in thirds in any given practice session. While at the conservatory, Gillet composed a set of etudes, Etudes pur L'enseignement Superieur du Hautbois. Gillet cared greatly about his students, so his life became increasingly strained when three of them were killed in World War I. Gillet retired for health reasons in 1919.

== Work with Lorée ==
Before Lorée was established in 1881, the dominant oboe manufacturer was Triebert, headed by Fréderic Triebert. Gillet worked with Triebert to formulate the system 6 oboe, better known as the "Conservatory" oboe. The Lorée company was established when François Lorée left his job as the last foreman of Triebert. According to Laila Storch, Gillet encouraged Lorée to open his own company. François Lorée and his son Adolphe Lucien Lorée worked with Gillet and made F. Lorée oboes one of the most popular brands manufactured. Gillet quickly designated Lorée oboes as the required brand to be used by students attending the Paris Conservatory. In 1906, Lorée's son, Lucien, collaborated with Gillet to create the "conservatory plateau system" oboe, a style that is universally in use today.

== Compositions ==
Gillet also composed a set of études titled Études pour L'enseignement Supérieur du Hautbois, or Studies for the Advanced Teaching of the Oboe, which have become a standard part of oboe repertoire. In the introduction to the études, Gillet stated that he wrote the studies for his students in order to be able to play the increasingly difficult solo and orchestral repertoire for the oboe, and that composers should use the études as a rough guide to the technical possibilities of the oboe.

I have tried to make the reading of [the studies] as arduous as possible in order to prepare you for all the surprises I have found in the orchestra and in certain sight-reading pieces at examinations and contests, and I have taken particular care to include numerous and very difficult passages and articulations, as well as certain high and low trills…I hope that it will make you familiar with every difficulty of your instrument; I shall be amply rewarded for my trouble if it is conducive to your progress and if it is of material help in developing your budding talent and in perfecting you in the very difficult art of the oboe.

The études are in common use today. Oboist John de Lancie used the étude book as the fourth and final book in his pedagogical progression for his students at the Curtis Institute of Music.
