= Ernest Lerwile =

Ernest Weiller (4 August 1863, in Paris – 6 April 1944) also known under the pseudonym Ernest Lerwile, was a French double-bass player and composer.

== Biography ==
A solo bassist with the Paris Opera, Weiller was responsible for the music of more than 400 songs from before and between the two wars on texts, among others, by Adolphe Jost, Michel Carré and Eugène Héros as well as many pieces for piano, double bass, string instruments, violins and cellos.

His best known work remains his musical composition for a three-act operetta by Guy de Téramond Peralta, Don Quichotte de la Manche (1935).

Of Jewish origin, Lerwille was dismissed from the Paris Opera in the autumn of 1940 but received an indemnity for his seniority until December 1942.

== Bibliography ==
- Agnès Terrier, L'orchestre de l'Opéra de Paris: de 1669 à nos jours, 2003, p. 247
