= Léon Moreau =

French/Breton composer

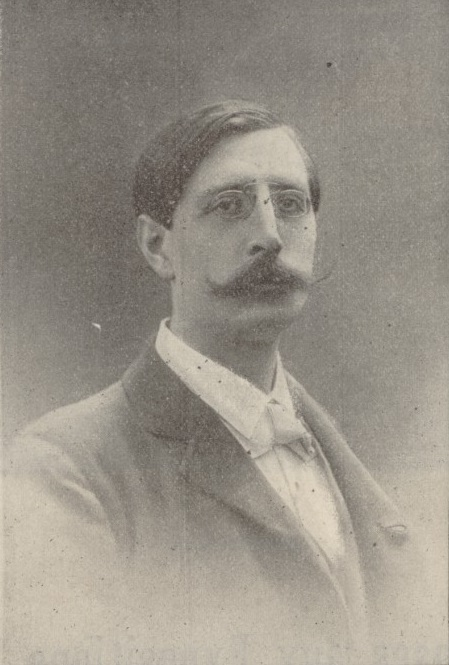
- Born: 13 July 1870; Brest
- Died: 11 April 1946 (aged 75)
- Occupation: Composer

Léon Moreau (13 July 1870 – 11 April 1946) was a French/Breton composer, winner of the second prize for composition in the Prix de Rome of 1899.

Born in Brest, he was active as a piano teacher and composer in Brest and Paris. A member of the short-lived Association des Compositeurs Bretons, he also wrote a number of film scores for the silent era (1894-1929), and also saxophone pieces for Elise Hall.

== Works (selection) ==
- Film scores
  - 1913: L'Agonie de Byzance by Louis Feuillade
  - 1922: The Agony of the Eagles by Dominique Bernard-Deschamps and Julien Duvivier
  - 1928: Madame Récamier by Tony Lekain and Gaston Ravel

== Bibliography ==
- Séverine Abhervé: Discours des compositeurs de musique sur le cinématographe en France (1919–1937): Ambitions, obstacles et horizons d'attente, on 1895.Mille huit cent quatre-vingt-quinze, 65, 2011, accessdate 28 June 2016
