= Fernand Gillet =

French musician

Fernand Gillet (15 October 1882 Paris, France – 8 March 1980 Boston) was a French and naturalized American oboist who is chiefly remembered for serving as the principal oboist of the Boston Symphony Orchestra from 1925 to 1946. He is also known for his work as a teacher of woodwinds at several prominent institutions in the United States and Canada. His Exercices sur les Gammes, les Intervalles et le Staccato is still a widely used instructional book for woodwind players at universities and conservatories. The International Double Reed Society holds an annual music competition named for him and a well known bassoonist: the Fernand Gillet-Hugo Fox International Competition.

== Life and career ==
Born in Paris, Gillet began studying at the Conservatoire de Paris at the age of 14. His principal teacher at the conservatoire was his uncle, the French oboist Georges Gillet (1854–1920). At the age of 19 he became principal oboist of the Lamoureux Orchestra, and at the age of 20 he became principal oboist of the Paris Opera. He remained at that post until the outbreak of World War I. During the war he served as a pilot in the French Air Force.

In 1925 Gillet moved to the United States to become principal oboist of the Boston Symphony Orchestra under conductor Serge Koussevitzky. He served in that post for the next 21 years, notably making several recordings with the orchestra. He became a naturalized United States Citizen on September 11, 1933, through the United States District Court for the District of Massachusetts, Boston. Beginning September 1942, he joined the faculty at the New England Conservatory in Boston where he remained for over thirty years. For many years he also concurrently taught on the faculties at the Conservatoire de musique du Québec à Montréal and Boston University. He continued to teach up into the last years of his life. His notable pupils included Robert Freeman, Eugene Lacritz, Jean Northrup, Pierre Rolland, Raymond Toubman, and Allan Vogel. On Freeman's inauguration in 1973 as director of the Eastman School, Gillet was awarded an honorary DMA degree.
