= Veules-les-Roses =

- Commune
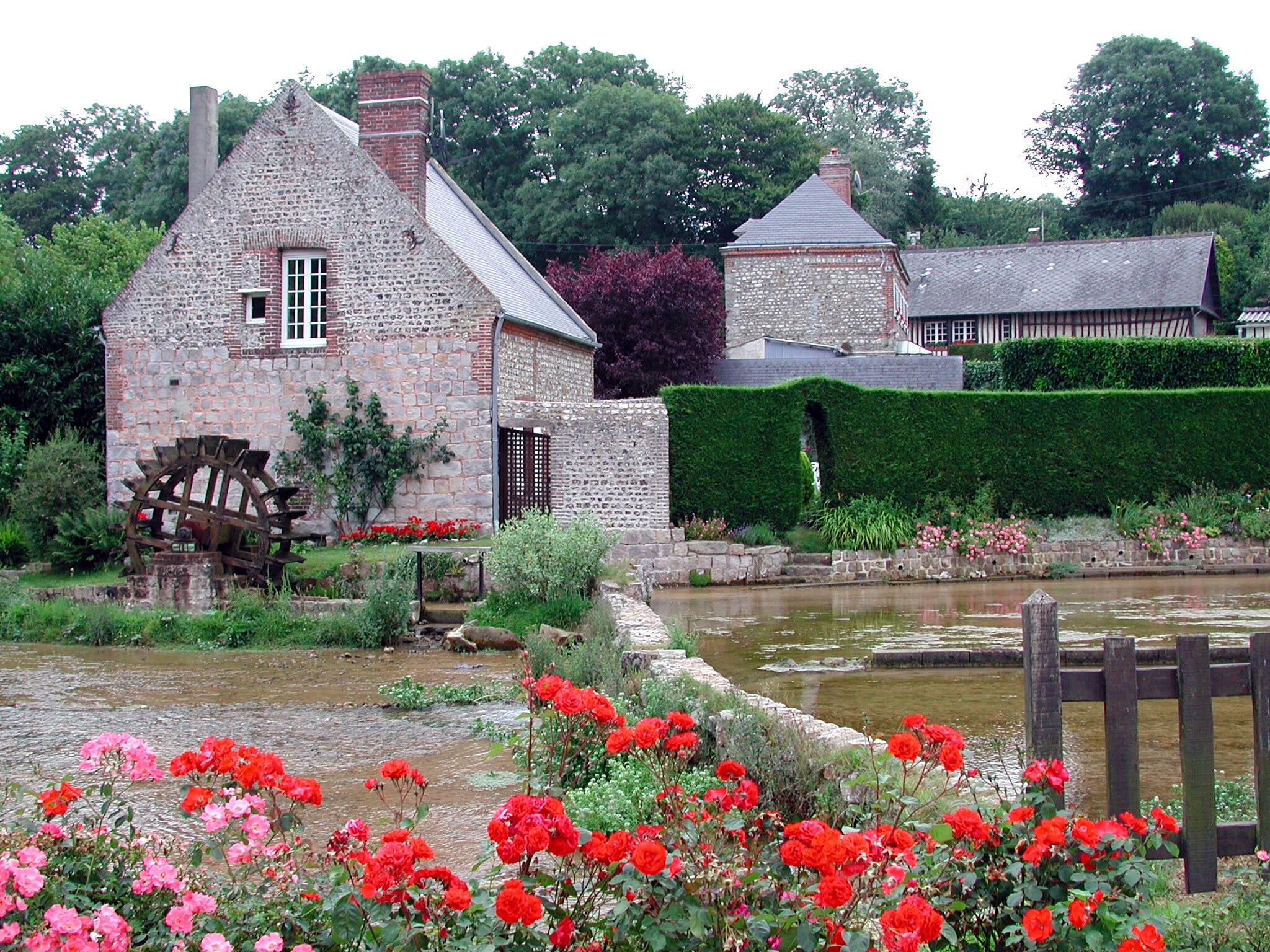
- The Cressonnières in Veules-les-Roses

- Coat of arms
- Location of Veules-les-Roses
- Location within France Location within Normandy
- Coordinates: 49°52′27″N 0°48′01″E
- Country: France
- Region: Normandy
- Department: Seine-Maritime
- Arrondissement: Dieppe
- Canton: Saint-Valery-en-Caux
- Intercommunality: CC Côte d'Albâtre

Government
  - Mayor (2026–32): Yves Tasse
- Area^{1}: 5.19 km^{2} (2.00 sq mi)
- Elevation: 12 m (39 ft)
- Highest elevation: 79 m (259 ft)
- Lowest elevation: 0 m (0 ft)
- Population (2023): 510
  - Density: 98/km^{2} (250/sq mi)
- Demonym: Veulais
- Time zone: UTC+01:00 (CET)
  - Summer (DST): UTC+02:00 (CEST)
- INSEE/Postal code: 76735 /76980
- Website: veules-les-roses.fr
- ^{1} French Land Register data, which excludes lakes, ponds, glaciers > 1 km^{2} (0.386 sq mi or 247 acres) and river estuaries.

Veules-les-Roses (French pronunciation: [vœl le ʁoz]; lit. 'Veules-the-Roses') is a coastal commune in the Seine-Maritime department in the Normandy region in northern France. It is a member of the association Les Plus Beaux Villages de France (The Most Beautiful Villages of France). It was known as Veules-en-Caux (lit. 'Veules-in-Caux') until 1897.

== Geography ==
Veules-les-Roses is a tourism and farming village situated on the coast of the English Channel in the Pays de Caux, some 12 miles (19 km) southwest of Dieppe at the junction of the D68, D926 and the D142 roads.

The river Veules, which flows through the commune, is the shortest sea-bound river in France at 1.149 kilometres (0.714 mi). Its water is used to create ponds for growing watercress whence it finds its way to the sea through a gap in the high chalk cliffs, which overlook a sand and pebble beach.

== Population ==
Historical population
Year	Pop.	±% p.a.
1968	691	—
1975	629	−1.33%
1982	686	+1.25%
1990	753	+1.17%
1999	676	−1.19%
2007	582	−1.85%
2012	539	−1.52%
2017	605	+2.34%
2023	510	−2.81%
Source: INSEE

== Places of interest ==
- The church of St. Martin, dating from the thirteenth century.
- A house known as ‘The Old Château' with a dovecote.
- A sixteenth-century presbytery now the Hôtel des Tourelles.
- A monument to Victor Hugo.
- Three restored watermills.
- A seventeenth-century chapel.
- The ruins of the church of St. Nicolas and a sandstone Celtic cross, both dating from the sixteenth century.
- The twelfth-century chapel of Notre-Dame.
- The ship wreck of the Cérons. The ship sank on 12 June 1940 and is visible on the shore at low tide.

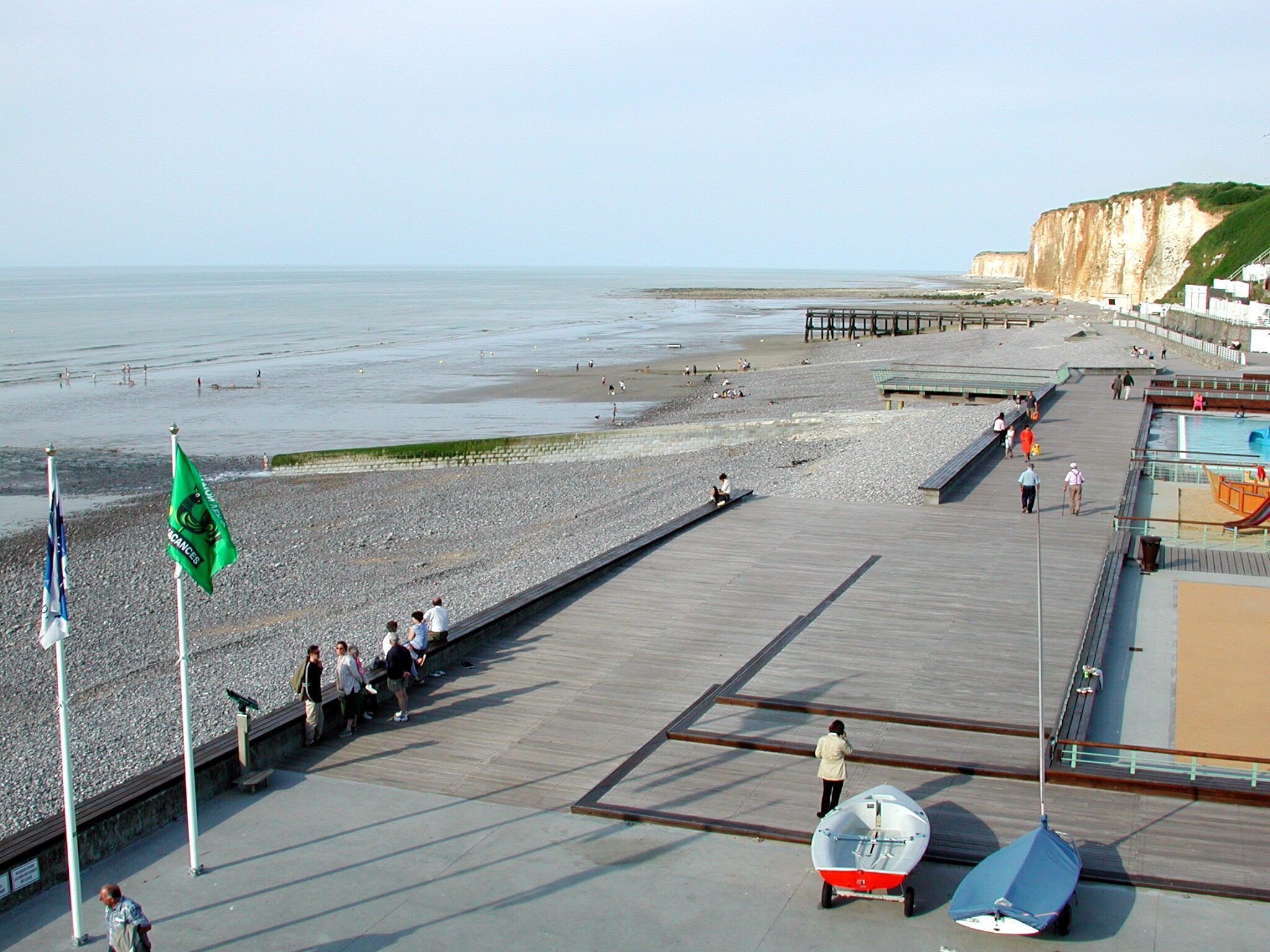
The beach

== People ==
Many artists have come here to paint, such as Anaïs Aubert, Étienne Mélingue, Henri Harpignies, Paul Meurice, Samuel Peploe and John Duncan Fergusson of the Scottish Colourists school, Ilya Repin and Alexey Bogolyubov of the Russian Peredvizhniki school. Writers include Leroux and Eugène Pierron, Alexandre Dumas fils, Lockroy, José-Maria de Heredia, Henri Rochefort, Alexis Bouvier, Jules Michelet and Victor Hugo, poets Jean Richepin and François Coppée, dramatists Jules Claretie, Henri Lavedan and Émile Bergerat and the composer Alexandre Georges.

Politicians such as Henri Maret, Alexandre Millerand, René Viviani, Louis Malvy, Albert Clemenceau and Pierre Taittinger came here for the sea air. Victor Boucher, Georges Chamarat, Saint-Granier, the writer Maurice Privat, Dominique Bonnaud as well as sports personalities Suzanne Lenglen and Lucien Gaudin.

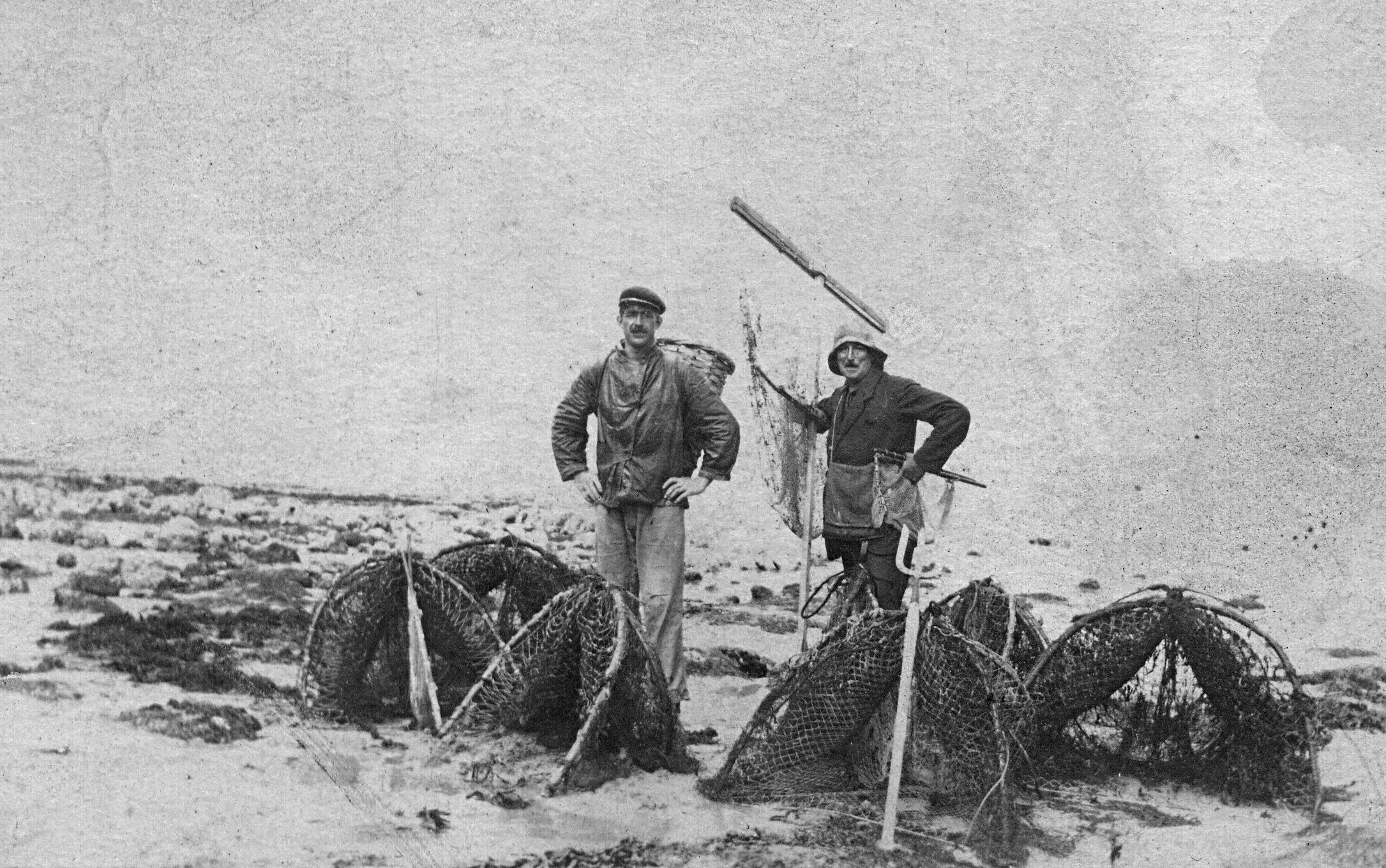
Prawn fishermen

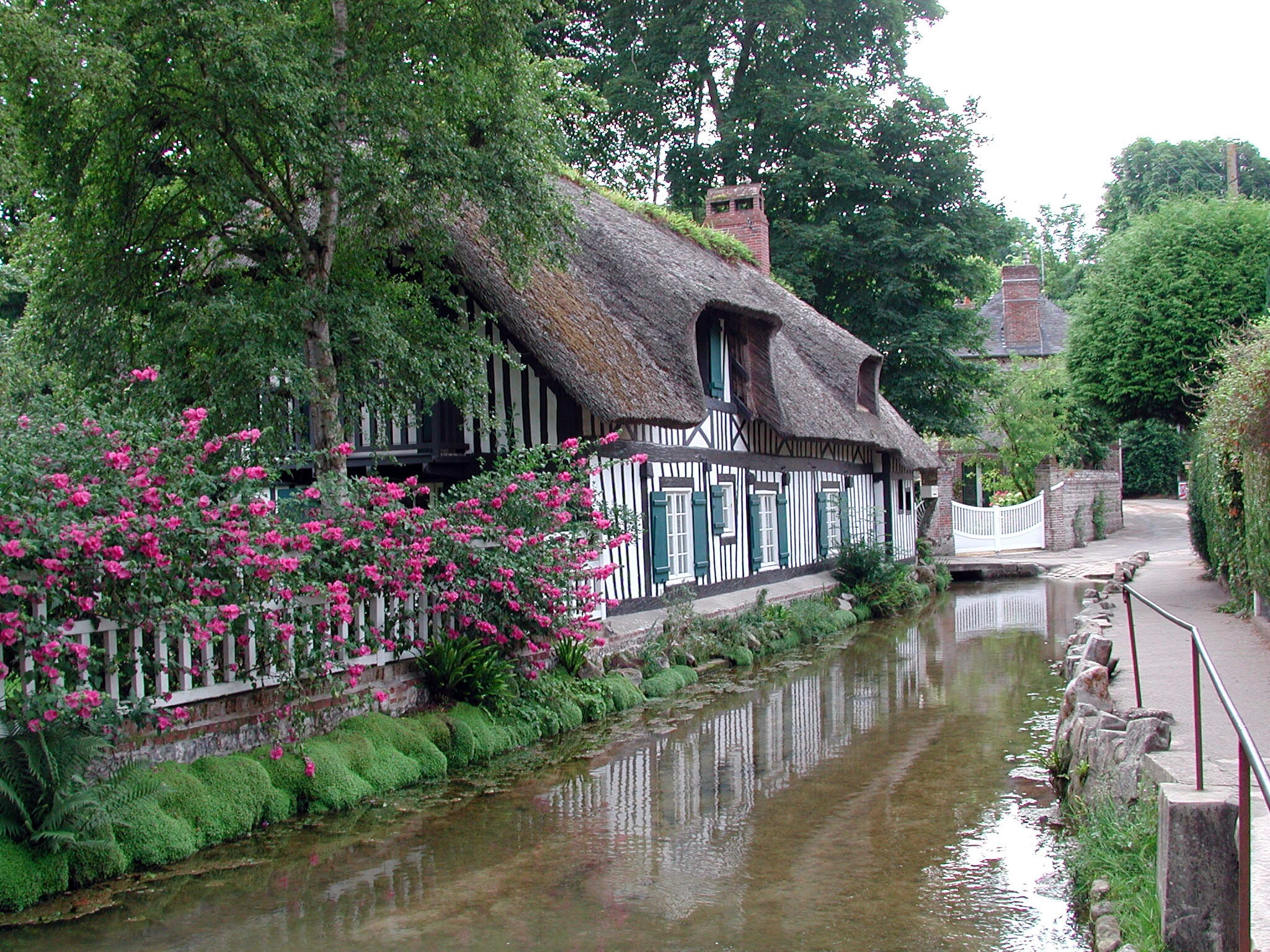
The river Veules

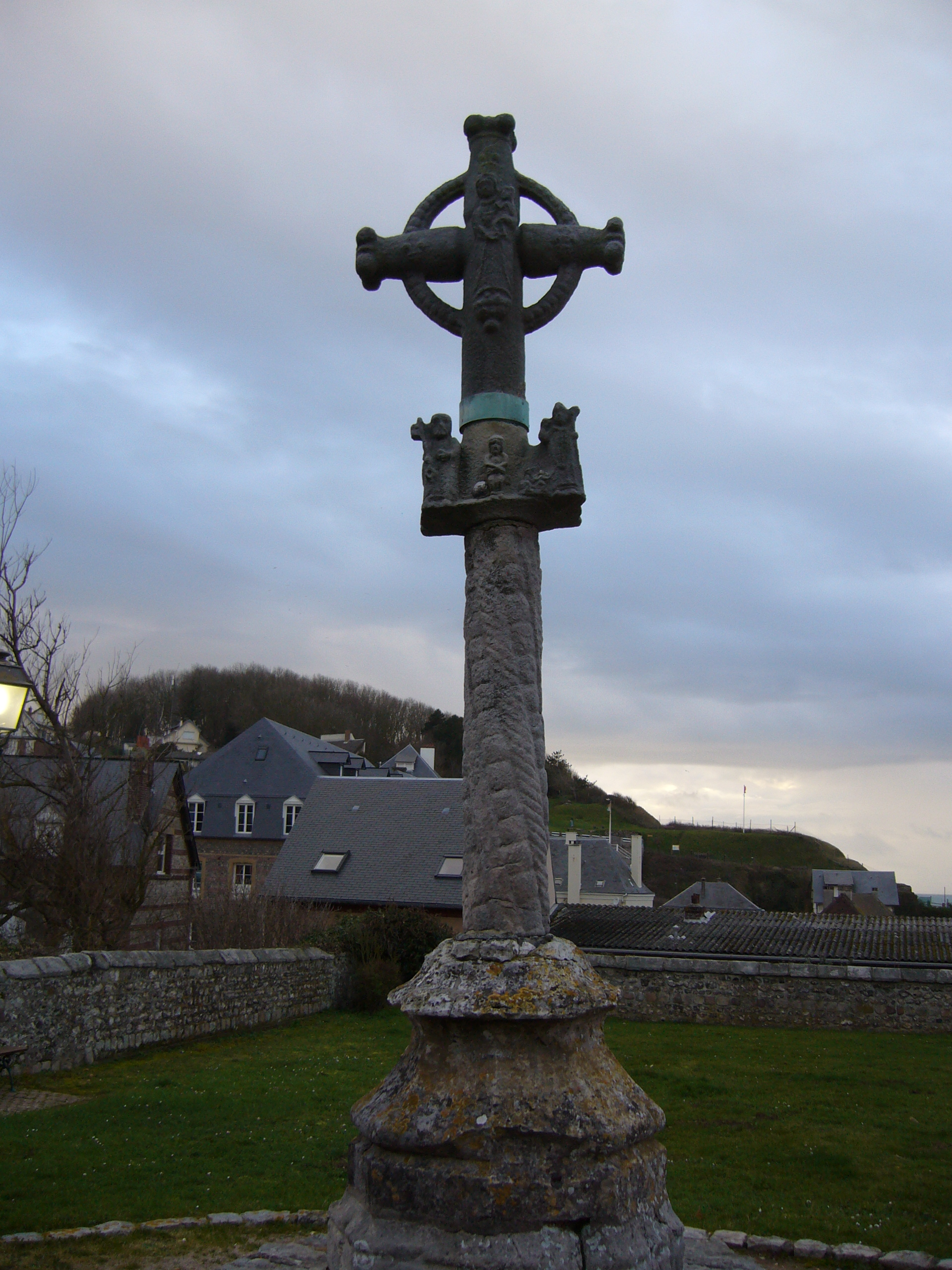
Cross

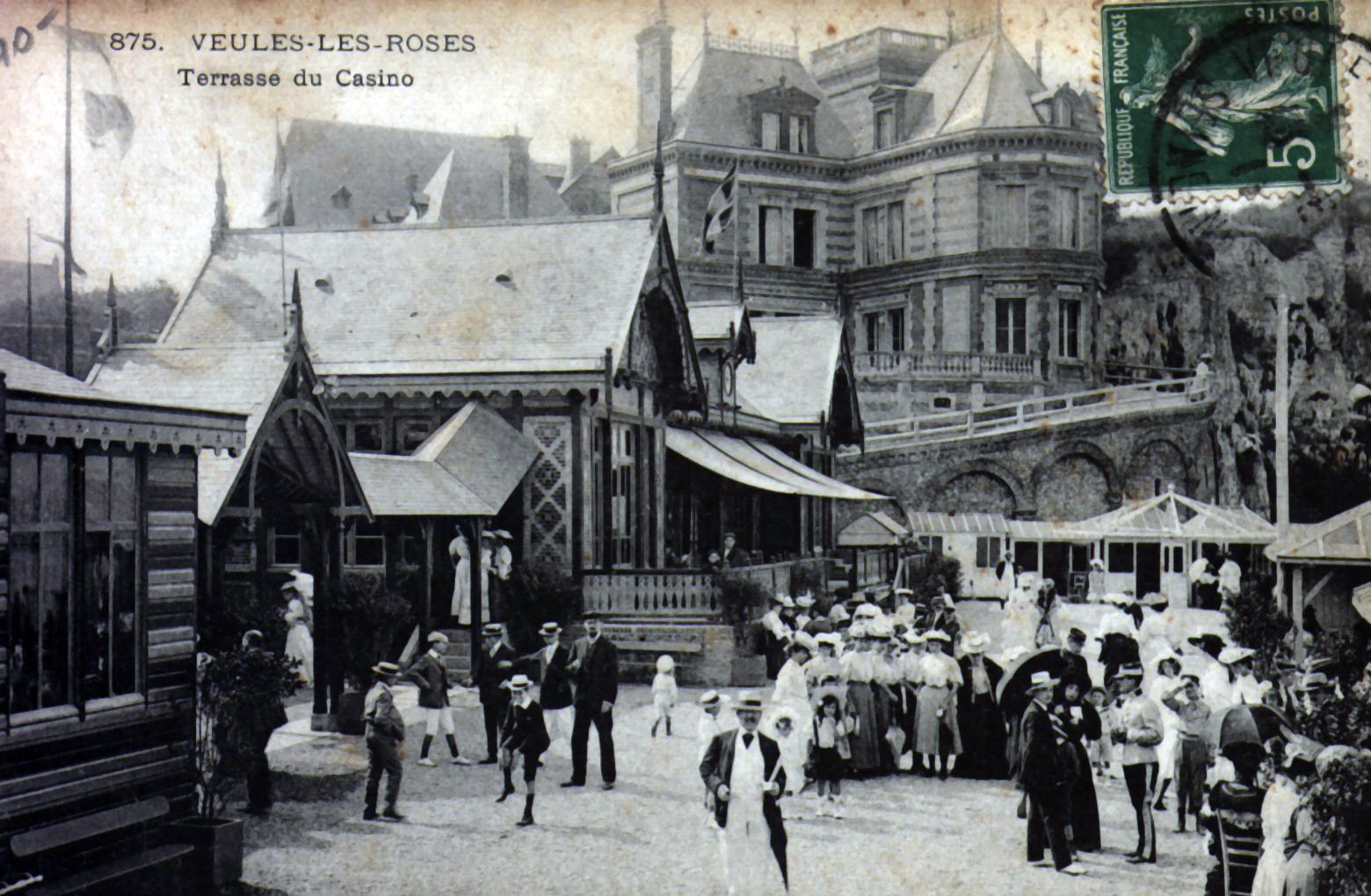
Terrace of the Casino before the war

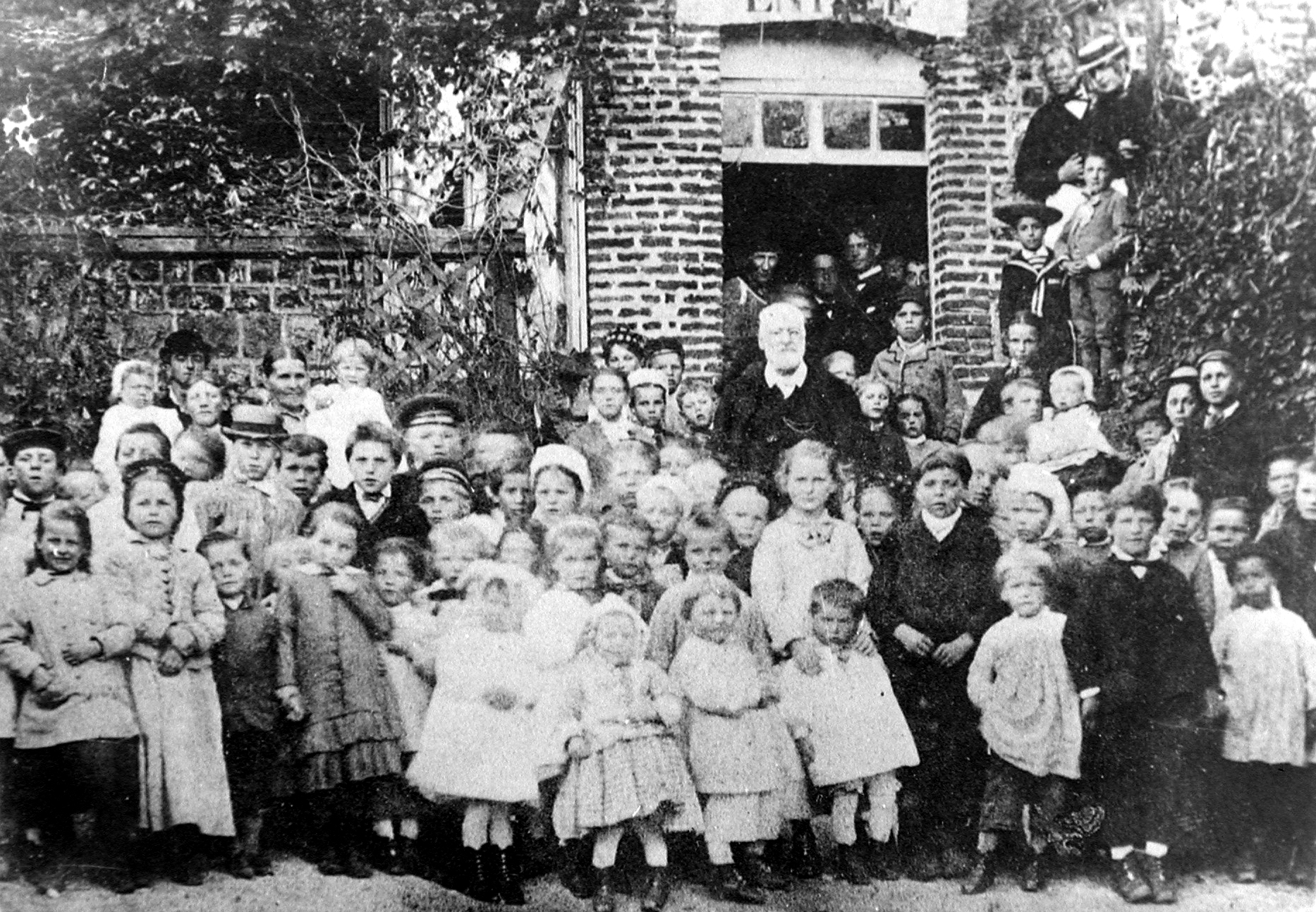
A party given by Victor Hugo to the children of Veules (24 September 1882)

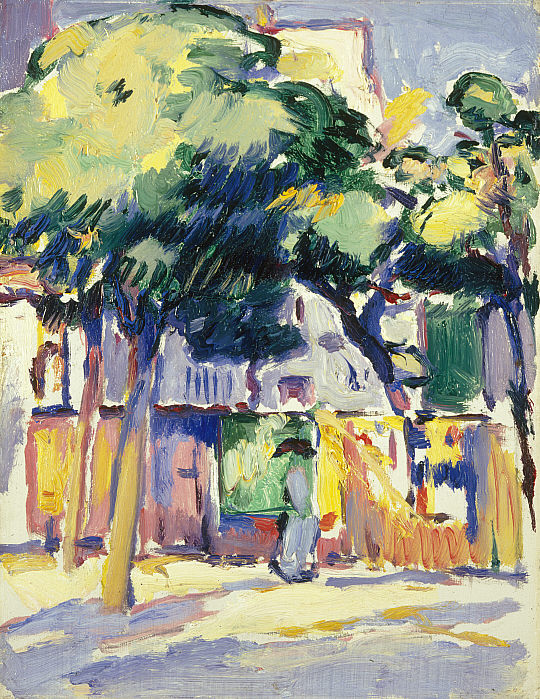
Veules les Rose c. 1905 Samuel Peploe

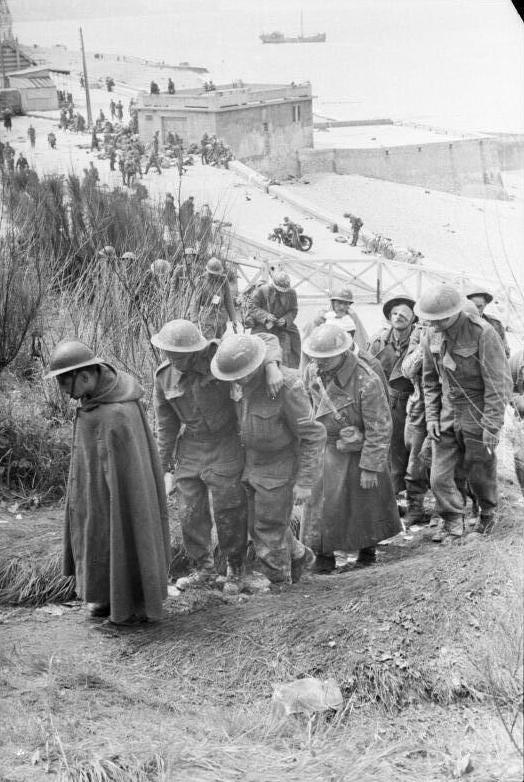
British and French prisoners at Veules, June 1940.

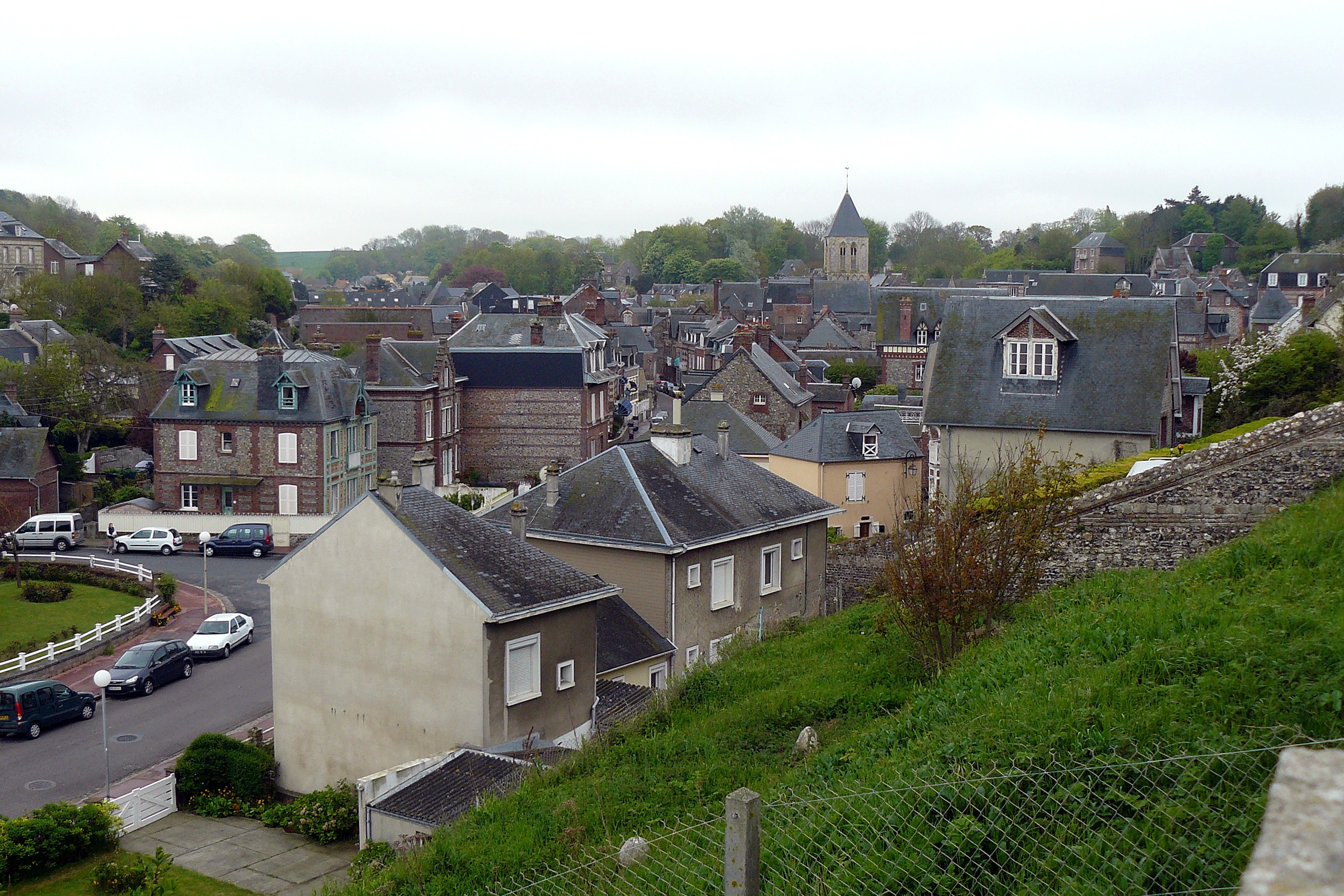
View of the church

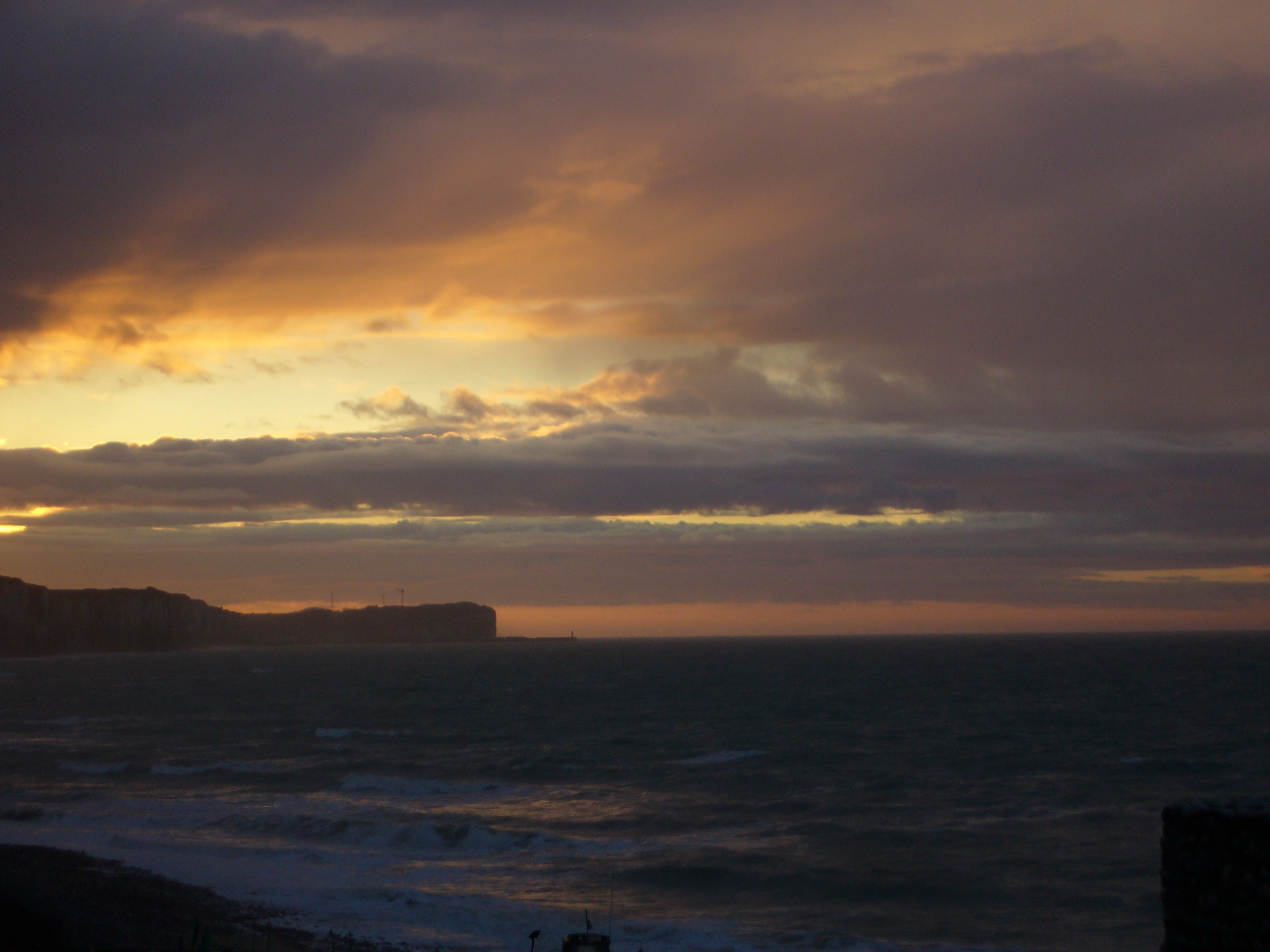
Sunset

== See also ==
- Communes of the Seine-Maritime department
