= Eutrope Bouret =

French sculptor

Eutrope Bouret (16 April 1833 in Paris – 1906) was a 19th-century French sculptor.

Eutrope Bouret was a student of Louis Buhot. He exhibited at the Salon from 1875 to 1903. He worked in conventional materials: marble, plaster, terracotta and bronze.

== Works ==
- Romeo and Juliet statues in French Bisque (pottery), unglazed porcelain c.1870
- Psyché au tribunal de Vénus.
- Bronze bust of Alexis Bouvier on the grave of the popular novelist at Père Lachaise Cemetery in Paris.

== Bibliography ==
- Emmanuel Bénézit, Dictionnaire des peintres, sculpteurs, dessinateurs et graveurs de tous les temps et de tous les pays, éditions Gründ, 1999.
