= Raphaël Adam (playwright) =

French chansonnier and playwright

Raphaël Adam (21 July 1860 – after 1940) was a 19th–20th-century French chansonnier and playwright.

A prolific chansonnier of the interwar period, his theatre plays were presented on the most significant Parisian stages of his time including the Théâtre du Gymnase, the Théâtre de Belleville, and the Théâtre des Folies-Dramatiques.

== Works ==
Theatre

- 1890: Prête-moi ton habit, comedy in 1 act
- 1891: Le Borgne, drama in 5 acts
- 1896: Ta femme engraisse, comedy in 1 act
- 1897: Les Ramoneurs, drama in 5 acts and 7 tableaux
- 1899: L'Hôtesse, one-act play, in verse
- 1901: Le Clown, drama in 5 acts and 7 tableaux
- 1911: Les Truands, opéra comique in 3 acts and 4 tableaux
- 1912: Le Prince Bonheur, opéra comique in 3 acts
- 1914: L'Évadé, drama in 5 acts and 7 tableaux
- 1917: Le Budget de l'amour, comedy in 1 act, with Joseph Vassivière
- 1924: Je suis un loup !, scène dramatique, music by Paul Maye
- 1932: Babaou, musical theatre, with Louis-Jacques Boucot, music by Pierre Chagnon and Fred Pearly
- undated: Une Plage d'amour, operetta in 2 acts, with Eugène Joullot

Songs

- 1885: "Un Baiser!", ditty, lyrics by Georges Laure and Raphaël Adam, music by Charles d'Orvict
- 1888: "Larmes d'amour!", song, lyrics by Raphaël Adam, music by Gaston Maquis
- 1911: "Lolita l'Andalouse", song
- 1911: "Willie de Chicago", lyrics by Raphaël Adam and Joë, music by Paul Knox
- 1911: "L'Amour brisé", sung waltz, lyrics by Raphaël Adam, music by Charles Borel-Clerc
- 1911: "L'Amour me fait peur!", sung waltz, lyrics by Raphaël Adam, music by René Casabianca
- 1911: "Nita l'Argentine", song, music by Casabianca
- 1912: "C'est rien!", song
- 1912: "Non, je ne te crois plus!", sung waltz, lyrics by Raphaël Adam, music by Ulysse Rebatet
- 1912: "Gilda", Italian song, lyrics by Franz Gravereau and Raphaël Adam., music by Cléon Triandaphyl
- 1912: "La petite Branche Keurie", lyrics by Raphaël Adam, music by Maxime Guitton
- 1913: "Bonsoir, chéri!", song - waltz, music by Octave Lamart
- 1913: "Soyez bons pour les ouvriers !", monologue, lyrics by Raphael Adam, music by Octave Lamart
- 1913: "Tu partis!... Tu revins!...", song, music by Lamart
- 1914: "Joli Baby", melody, lyrics by Raphaël Adam, music by Georges Blangy and Clément Jenner
- 1914: "Le savez-vous ?", waltz melody, music by Blangy and Jenner
- 1914: "Sur la Rive fleurie!", song, music by Blangy and Jenner
- 1915: "L'Angelus d'Alsace", melody, lyrics by Raphaël Adam and Gaston Gross, music by Louis Billaut
- 1915: "C'était très chic le Tangs!", satirical song, lyrics by Raphaël Adam and Gaston Gross, music by Louis Billaut
- 1915: "Dormez en Paix, soldats!", poem, music by Louis Billaut
- 1915: "Sur les Bras des mamans", poem by Raphaël Adam, music by Louis Billaut
- 1915: "La Liberté au dessus de tout!", march and Allied patriotic song, lyrics by Raphaël Adam and Gaston Gross, music by Louis Billaut
- 1915: "La Voix de la Lorraine!", song, lyrics by Raphaël Adam and Gaston Gross, music by Léopold Danty
- 1915: "C'est pour la France!", patriotic song, lyrics by Raphaël Adam and Jean Meudrot, music by Louis Billaut
- 1915: "Le Plumet du Saint-Cyrien", lyrics by Raphaël Adam, music by René de Buxeuil
- 1915: "C'était très chic le tango!", satirical song, with Gross, music by Billaut
- 1915: "L'oiseau sans ailes", slow waltz, music by Blangy and Jenner
- 1916: "La Danse pour la vie ou la Danseuse masquée ou Madeleine", song
- 1923: "Le Régiment de l'avenir", voice and piano, lyrics by Raphaël Adam, music by Ernest Vital Louis Gillet
- 1924: "La Louve", voice and piano, lyrics by Raphaël Adam, music by Joseph Sieulle
- 1926: "Marche des petites reines", voice and piano
- 1936: "Le Chêne géant", voice and piano, lyrics by Raphaël Adam, music by Édouard Van Malderen
- 1936: "Dix sous d'jetons", voice and piano, music by Van Malderen
- 1937: "Chez les Papous!", sung fox-trot for orchestra with leading piano

== Bibliography ==
- Florian Bruyas, Histoire de l'opérette en France, 1855-1965, 1974, p. 523
