= Louis Speyer =

Louis-Marius Speyer (2 May 1890, Paris - 8 January 1980, Boston) was a French-born American oboist best known for playing solo English horn in the Boston Symphony Orchestra from 1918 to 1964.

Speyer studied oboe at the Paris Conservatoire under Georges Gillet. At the annual Paris Conservatoire Concours he won a second Accessit in 1909, a first Accessit in 1910, followed by a Premier prix in 1911 .

Speyer became an extra oboist for the Orchestre Colonne, which accompanied the Ballets Russes in France, and in that way participated in several premieres of works by Ravel and Stravinsky. In early 1913 he joined the newly formed Orchestre du Théâtre des Champs-Élysées, conducted by Pierre Monteux, which gave its first performance on 2 April 1913. Two months later, he played in this orchestra in one of the most famous concerts of all time: the program included Les Sylphides, Le Spectre de la Rose and the Polovtsian Dances, but is remembered for the raucous premiere of Stravinsky's Rite of Spring.

Speyer came to America in the summer of 1918 with a French military band for a three-week good-will tour, but stayed, as he had been invited to join the Boston Symphony Orchestra, for which he was hired by Henri Rabaud. During his exceptionally long career, he played under the conductors Pierre Monteux, Serge Koussevitzky, Charles Munch and Erich Leinsdorf. Munch was under pressure to ease the 72-year-old Speyer into retirement, but failed to do so and Speyer outlasted Munch by 2 years. Very early in his career in the U.S., Speyer also played in the Boston Symphony Ensemble, a summer concert chamber orchestra conducted by Daniel Kuntz.

Speyer was awarded both the Reconnaissance Française medal and knighthood in the Legion of Honor by the French government.

Speyer became a US citizen in October 1923. He married Camille Torno, whose French parents had immigrated to the US from Algeria.

== Dedications ==
Inspired by Speyer's playing, the art patron Elizabeth Sprague Coolidge convinced Arthur Honegger in 1947 to write a concerto for English horn. Though Honegger ended up writing a double concerto premiered in 1949 in Europe without Speyer, the Concerto da camera for flute, English horn and orchestra is dedicated to him.

Numerous other English horn works have been dedicated to Speyer. Among the better known is Paul Hindemith's English horn sonata completed in 1941 at the end of a summer at Tanglewood.
