= John Croisier =

French composer and playwright

- Died: 1915
- Occupations: Composer and playwright

John Henri Croisier (? – 1915) was a French composer and playwright.

== Works ==
He created pieces for piano and operettas for which he sometimes wrote both the music as well as the lyrics.

- 1880: L’Année féminine, calendrier inamovible
- 1894: Échos de La Varenne, valse, piano, with violon ad libitum accompagnement
- 1894: Joyeux départ, polka-marche, piano. Op. 8
- 1895: A l'ivresse, chanson bachique
- 1896: Avec toi !, polka-mazurka, piano
- 1896: Sérénade à Phoebé, suite de valses, piano
- 1896: Colombine-Colombinette, fantaisies, quadrille for piano
- 1897: Sans Fard, en vers... et pour tous, poems
- 1899: Nos petits lignards, polka-marche, piano
- 1899: Elle !, drame réaliste in 1 act, with Trébla
- 1900: L'Aigledindon, parodie bouffe in 1 act and 1 prologue, with Eugène Joullot
- 1902: L'Autruche tricolore, ou la Possédée de la rue du Caire, folie-vaudeville in 1 act, with Albert Pajol
- 1902: L'Enlèvement de Césarine, folie-vaudeville in 1 act, with Pajol
- 1902: Les Forfaits de Savarin, folie-vaudeville in 1 act, with Pajol
- 1902: Le Tueur de femmes, comédie-bouffe in 1 act, with Pajol
- 1902: Les Surprises de l'amour, folie-vaudeville in 1 act, with Pajol
- 1902: Le Choix d'une belle-mère, comédie bouffe in 1 act, with Pajol
- 1903: Ciel d'avril, valse, piano
- 1903: Derniers adieux, valse, piano
- 1903: De Carthage à Montmartre. Civita
- 1903: Helvétia-marche, march, piano
