= Prosper Mimart =

French clarinetist and instructor

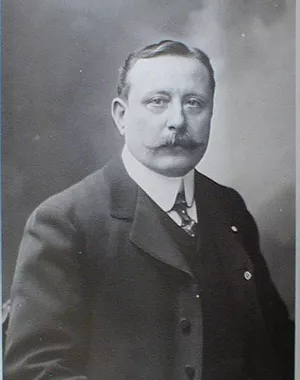
Prosper Mimart

Prosper Mimart (1859–1928) was a French clarinetist and instructor at the Paris Conservatoire.

He was the dedicatee of Debussy's Première rhapsodie and gave the premiere of the work in 1911.
