= Henry Buguet =

French journalist and librettist (1845–1920)

- Born: 18 November 1845; Paris
- Died: 10 June 1920 (aged 74)
- Occupations: Journalist, dramatist

Henry Buguet (18 November 1845 in Paris – 10 June 1920) was a French journalist and dramatist.
