= Henri Boucherat =

French playwright and chansonnier

Henri Boucherat (? – died after 192) was a French playwright and chansonnier.

== Biography ==
The son of a wheelwright from Noyers who became a coachbuilder in Paris, Henri Boucherat was initially a journalist specializing in finance. Managing director of the Journal des rentes et valeurs, the Cote internationale des coupons and the Cote Bleue , it was only alongside his stock market activities that he became a playwright and songwriter.

He is buried alongside his wife (born Jeanne Léonie Loiseau in Chaumont, Haute-Marne on May 12, 1860, and died in Paris 9th arrondissement on April 5, 1929) at the Père Lachaise Cemetery.

== Works ==
- 1884: Mon ami Pierrot, review of the year 1884
- 1885: Théodora à Montluçon, one-act parody in eight tableaux, with Guillaume Livet
- 1898: Le Diable au moulin, one-act operetta, with Henry Moreau
- 1898: Métempsycose ! Lettre à une parisienne, music by Laurent Halet
- 1898: Y a pas d'erreur, revue in two acts and four tableaux, with Moreau
- 1898: Filles d'Arles ! Souvenirs de Province, song, with Jules Gaillard, music by Étienne Jacquier
- 1900: Le Medjidié, one-act vaudeville, with Moreau
- 1900: Ohé ! la Province, vaudeville-revue in 1 act and two tableaux, with Moreau
