= Cabart =

- Type: Subsidiary of F. Lorée
- Industry: Musical instruments
- Founded: 1893; 133 years ago in La Couture-Boussey, Eure, France
- Products: Bassoons, clarinets, contrabassoons, English horns, flutes, oboes, saxophones

Cabart is a French brand of musical wind instruments. As an independent brand, it was declined by the names Thibouville-Cabart and Cabart a Paris. The name was bought out by F. Lorée in 1974 to name its range of student-level oboes: Cabart 74 and Cabart.

== Brand origins ==
The Thibouville family is from La Couture-Boussey (Eure, France). From the early nineteenth century, its members would create about two dozen musical instruments brands with the name Thibouville. Jean-Baptiste Thibouville, born May 4, 1832, in La Couture-Boussey, was the inheritor of the brand Thibouville-Herouard (his parents' names) founded in 1842. First, He created two companies in Paris, which only last a short time because of the death of his associates. In 1867, he married Rose Leonie Cabart, daughter of Jean Michel Cabart, owner and comb manufacturer in Ézy-sur-Eure (Eure, France). In 1869, he established in Ézy-sur-Eure the Thibouville-Cabart factory.

== Factory's life from 1869 to 1977 ==
- 1878: Paris World's Fair (Wind instrument category - Bronze medal).
- 1889: Paris World's Fair (Wind instrument category - Silver medal).
- 1880-1890s: Louis Bas (1863–1944, 1st oboist at the Opera of Paris and at the Société des concerts, and J.-B. Thibouville's son-in-law), holds the shop in Paris. He makes research to improve oboes and bassoons.

It is from these years that the name Cabart a Paris is used for high quality instruments, other instruments are stamped Thibouville-Cabart a Paris.

- 1897: Death of Jean-Baptiste Thibouville, his wife takes charge of the factory.

In the following decade, Paul Thiberville (1874–1949), another son-in-law, gradually takes the leadership of the company.

- 1948 : André Lhéridat and Marcel Lefèvre buy out the company.
- 1971-1977: Liquidation of the company. F. Lorée buys Cabart name for its student oboes in 1974.

== Instruments ==
Mostly oboe, but also bassoon (German bassoon from the 1940s), contrabassoon, clarinet, flute, saxophone and English horn.

== Locations ==
- in Ezy-sur-Eure : in 1877, buildings bought « Rue Grande » (now Place Félix Hulin). Installation of a steam engine about 1880.

From 1948 to 1950, major expansion, all stages of production now taking place there.

- in Paris : 35 rue Notre-Dame-de-Nazareth (attested in 1867, 1878), 15 boulevard Saint-Martin (1896), 22 rue Meslay (1901), 11 rue de Castellane (1905) and 34 rue laborde (1909, 1913). No longer address in Paris in subsequent documents (1928, etc.).

== Sources ==
Original Sources

- Etat civil, Archives départementales de l'Eure.
- Constant Pierre, « Les facteurs d'instruments de musique », Paris, 1893.
- M. de Pontécoulant, « La musique à l'exposition universelle de 1867 », Paris, 1868.
- Chouquet, "Rapport sur les instruments de musiques à l'exposition universelle de 1878", Paris, 1878.
- « Annuaire des artistes et de l'enseignement dramatique et musical », Paris, 1896, p. 380.
- « Annuaire des artistes et de l'enseignement dramatique et musical », Paris, 1909, p. 337 et p. 678.
- « Annuaire français de la facture instrumentale et de l'édition musicale », Paris, 1913.

Studies

- François Camboulive, brochure « Thibouville-Cabart Ezy-sur-Eure », archives départementales de l'Eure.
- William Waterhouse, « New Langwill Index ».
