= Elise Hall (musician) =

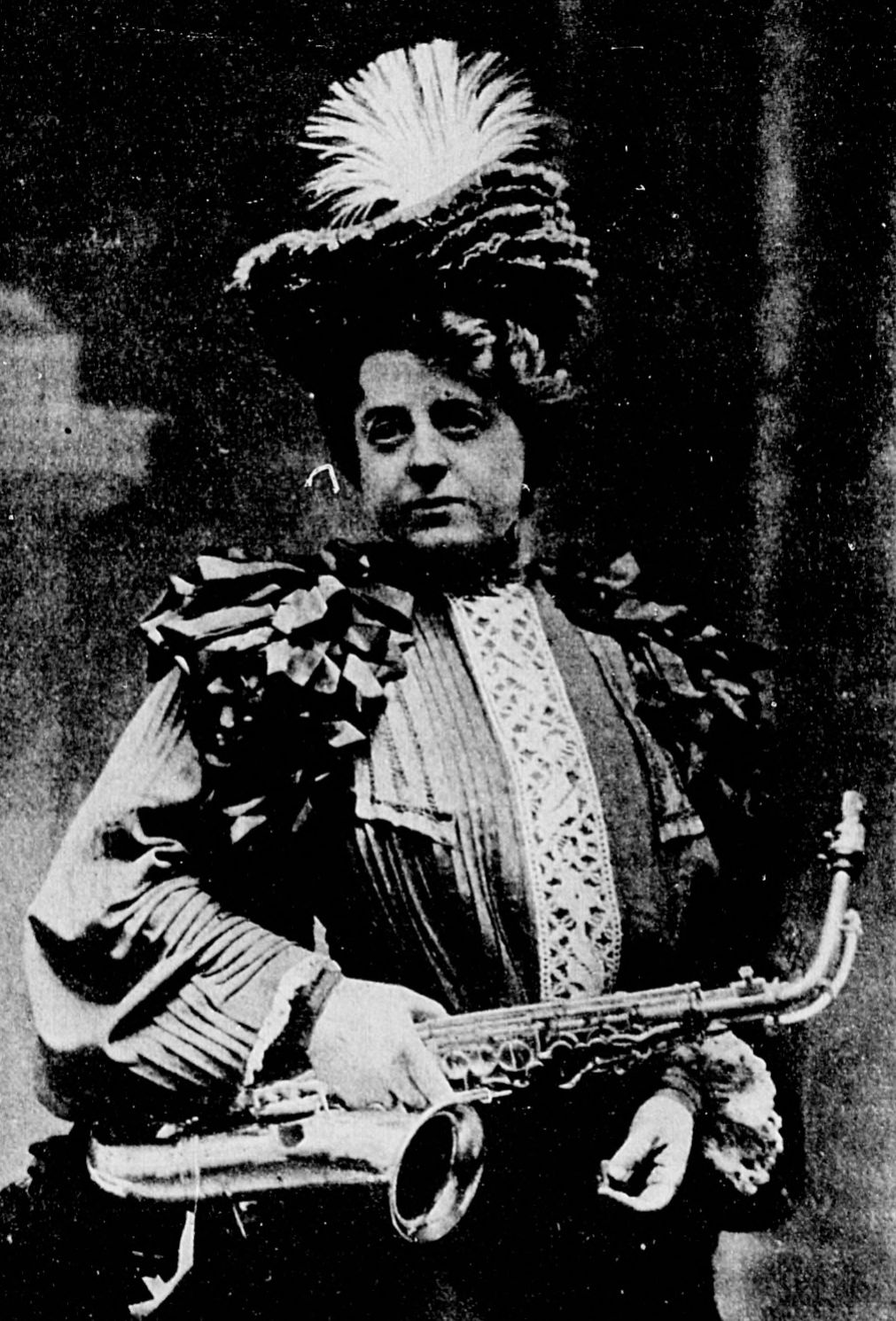
Elise Hall

Elise Hall (15 April 1853 in Paris – 27 November 1924 in Boston) was one of the first prominent female saxophonists in the United States. She founded the Boston Orchestral Club.

She was a patron of saxophone repertory and commissioned scores from modern French composers such as Claude Debussy's Rhapsodie for saxophone and orchestra, as well as music from Vincent d'Indy, André Caplet, Léon Moreau and other composers of the day. At age 47 she began to study saxophone with Georges Longy.
