= Guillaume Livet =

French playwright, journalist, novelist and physician

Charles Livet
- Born: Charles Guillaume Livet; 24 January 1856; Paris, France
- Died: 16 April 1919 (aged 63); Paris, France
- Occupations: Playwright, journalist, novelist

Charles Guillaume Livet (24 January 1856 – 16 April 1919) was a French playwright, journalist, novelist and physician.

== Biography ==
A student in hospitals and journalist with L’Événement, Le Temps, Gil Blas, the Voltaire (1883-1891) or, among others, the Journal (1892), he graduated Doctor of Medicine (Paris, 1896) and was distinguished for his research on cancer by applying calcium carbide fragments on cancerous parts and obtained the cessation of pain and bleeding.

As a writer, we owe him theatre plays and romance novels, then, during the First World War, novels about the trenches.

== Works ==
- 1882: Le Mariage de Racine, comedy in 1 act, in verse, with Gustave Vautrey
- 1884: À travers la porte, saynète in 1 act, in verse
- 1884: Les Petits Pois, comedy in 1 act
- 1885: Les Récits de Jean Féru, novel
- 1885: Chez les Martin, saynète in 1 act, in prose
- 1885: La Sang-brulé, drama in 5 acts and 6 tableaux, with Alexis Bouvier
- 1885: Théodora à Montluçon, parody in 1 act and 8 tableaux, with Henri Boucherat
- 1888: Il reviendra, review in 3 tableaux of the year 1887, with Amédée de Jallais
- 1888: La Vie du marin ballet, pantomime dramatique in 3 acts and 20 tableaux
- 1895: L'Amour forcé, novel
- 1896: Emploi du carbure de calcium en chirurgie (et particulièrement dans le traitement du cancer de l'utérus), thesis
- 1909: Nick Carter, play in 5 acts and 8 tableaux, with Alexandre Bisson
- 1910: Le Songe d'une nuit d'automne, novel
- 1912: Fille adoptive, novel
- 1912: Nouveau manuel de médecine pour tous
- 1912: Sous le charme, novel
- 1913: Cœur d'enfant, novel
- 1913: Coupable par amour, novel
- 1913: Miramar, l'homme aux yeux de chat, novel
- 1913: Pietro Danera, le semeur de morts, novel
- 1914: Épilepsie et troubles vaso-moteurs localisés consécutifs à une fièvre puerpérale
- 1915: Marraines de poilus, novel
- 1916: La Faute d'un brave homme, novel
- 1916: Le Martyre d'une infirmière, novel
- 1916: Le Portrait de l'aimée, novel
- 1917: Amour et gloire, novel
- 1917: Enfant de vierge, novel
- 1917: Une Larme de poète, one-act play in verse, with Joseph Vassivière
- 1917: Un Revenant, novel
- 1918: Cœur de vieillard, novel
- 1918: Pauvre Mado, novel
- 1919: L'Enfant aux deux mères novel

== Bibliography ==
- Edmond Antoine Poinsot, Dictionnaire des Pseudonymes, 1887, p. 295
- Edmond Benjamin, Paul Desachy, Le Boulevard : Croquis Parisiens, 1893, p. 239
- Henri Avenel, La Presse française au vingtième siècle, 1901, p. 604
- Just Lucas-Championnièrre, Journal de médecine et de chirurgie pratiques, vol.90, 1919, p. 368 (obituary)
- Noël Richard, Le Mouvement décadent : dandys, esthètes et quintessents, 1968, p. 100
