= The Agony of the Eagles (1922 film) =

1922 film

- Directed by: Dominique Bernard-Deschamps; Julien Duvivier
- Written by: Georges d'Esparbès (novel)
- Cinematography: Georges Asselin; Albert Cohendy
- Music by: Léon Moreau
- Production company: Pathé Frères
- Release date: 3 February 1922
- Country: France
- Languages: Silent; French intertitles

The Agony of the Eagles (French: L'agonie des aigles) is a 1922 French silent historical film directed by Dominique Bernard-Deschamps and Julien Duvivier and starring Gaby Morlay, Gilbert Dalleu]] and Séverin-Mars. It was remade in 1933.

== Cast ==
- Gaby Morlay as Lise Charmoy
- Gilbert Dalleu as Goglu
- Séverin-Mars as Napoleon / Colonel de Montander
- Maxime Desjardins as Commandant Doguereau / Général Petit
- Fernand Mailly as Chambuque
- Madame Séverin-Mars as Empress Marie-Louise
- Renée Wilde
- Jean Rauzena as The King of Rome
- Max Dhartigny as Fortunat
- Henri Duval as Le Préfet de Police
- René Maupré as Pascal de Breuilly
- Thierry Angély]
- Henri Dauvillier as Triaire
- Ernst Legal as Fouché
- Moreno as Metternich

== Bibliography ==
- Klossner, Michael. The Europe of 1500-1815 on Film and Television: A Worldwide Filmography of Over 2550 Works, 1895 Through 2000. McFarland & Company, 2002.
