= Alexis Bouvier =

French novelist and playwright

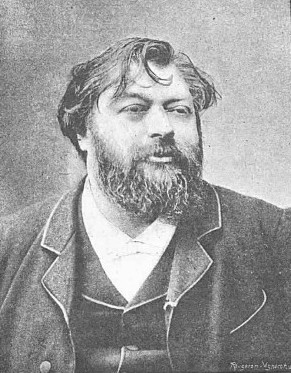
- Alexis Bouvier by Charles Gallot
- Born: François Alexis Bouvier; 15 January 1836; Paris
- Died: 18 May 1892 (aged 56); 18th arrondissement of Paris
- Occupations: Novelist, playwright

Alexis Bouvier (15 January 1836 –18 May 1892) was a 19th-century French novelist and playwright.

== Biography ==
Born into a working-class family, Alexis Bouvier began his professional life as a sculptor in bronze until 1863, while taking care to educate himself in order to fill gaps in his poor formation. He quickly showed writing ambitions.

His early works are short stories depicting street scenes or workshops, folk songs and operettas for neighboring theaters and singing cafes. Some have been very successful such as Les Trois Lettres d'un marin or La Canaille sung in particular by Rosa Bordas. Le Figaro, through Hippolyte de Villemessant, always looking for new products for his paper, gave him a chance from 1863. Literary realism was then in vogue and Alexis Bouvier wrote dramatic short stories that allowed him to tell about social misery and the lives of the unhappy and disinherited he knew. He liked to remind of his plebeian origin and used these stories to better evoke it.

To support himself and complete his meager profits, he sold lemonade on the boulevard de Strasbourg, and it is on a table corner between two operettas and dramatic short stories that he wrote his first serialized novel. When Villemessant, bored with his uniform and related to mourning stories suspended their publication in Le Figaro, Alexis Bouvier started publishing his serialized novels in five-cents newspapers. His success was immediate and his work was prolific in this area. Gifted with a large imagination, he could write three novels at the same time in his most productive years. Despite many expenses he made a good living. For several years, he received ten to twelve guests all summer in his estate at Veules-les-Roses.

In 1888, a hemiplegia accompanied by aphasia and memory loss forced him to give up all work. Because of the state of financial insecurity he was in, a sale of paintings was realized in his favor in 1892 by his painter friends but a new attack of paralysis struck him. He died at his home boulevard de Clichy in May 1892. He is buried at Père Lachaise Cemetery (47th division). His tomb is adorned with a bronze bust by Eutrope Bouret.

== Works ==
Operettas and vaudevilles

- 1862: Versez, marquis
- 1863: Mlle de Longchamp
- 1863: Eurêka
- 1864: Une paire d'Anglais
- 1865: Une veuve d'un vivant
- 1865: La Gamine du village
- 1874: Suzanne au bain
- 1875: Les Petites Dames du Temple

Dramas

- 1873: Auguste Manette
- 1878: Le Mariage d'un forçat
- 1882: La Dame au domino rose
- 1882: Malheurs aux pauvres !
- 1883: La Sang-Brûlé

Novels

- La Duchesse Quinquenveult (1868)
- Les Pauvres (1870)
- Auguste Manette (1870)
- Les Soldats du désespoir (1871)
- Le Mariage d'un forçat (1873)
- Les Drames de la forêt (1873)
- Le Domino rose (1878)
- Amour, Misère et Cie (1878)
- M. Coquelet, le mouchard (1878)
- La Grande Iza (1878)
- M. Trumeau (1879)
- La Belle grêlée (1879)
- La Femme du mort (1879)
- Malheurs aux pauvres ! (1880)
- Iza, Lolotte et Cie (1880)
- Les Créanciers de l'échafaud (1880)
- Melle Beau Sourire (1880)
- Melle Olympe (1880)
- Le Fils d'Antony (1881)
- Le Club des coquins (1881)
- Caulot le garde-chasse (1881)
- La Princesse saltimbanque (1881)
- Bayonnette (1882)
- Le Bel Alphonse (1882)
- La Bouginotte (1882)
- La Rousse (1882)
- La Petite Duchesse (1883)
- La Sang-Brûlé (1883)
- Étienne Marcel, ou la Grande Commune (1884)
- Le Fils de l'amant (1884)
- Le Mari de sa fille (1884)
- La Petite Cayenne (1884)
- Veuve et Vierge (1884)
- Iza la ruine (1885)
- La Mort d'Iza (1885)
- La Belle Herboriste (1885)
- L'Armée du crime (1886)
- Lolo (1886)
- Colette (1887)
- Ninie (1887)
- La Petite Baronne (1887)
- Melle Beaubaiser (1888)
- Ninie (1888)
- Le Mariage d'un forçat (1888)
- Les Yeux de velours (1888)
- La Belle Olga (1889)
- Les Seins de marbre (1889)
- Les Petites Ouvrières (1889)
- Les Amours de sang (1890)
- Chuchote (1891)
- Les Assassins de femmes (1891)
- Les Petites Blanchisseuses (1891)
- Les Chansons du Peuple (1891)

== Sources ==
- Obituary in Encyclopédique Larousse 1892 (page 1269-1270)
- Frédéric Loliée : Obituary in la Nouvelle Revue May 1892 (pages 843-846)
