= Ernest Gillet =

French composer and cellist

- Born: Ernest Vital Louis Gillet; 13 September 1856; Batignolles (Paris)
- Died: 6 May 1940 (aged 83); Paris
- Occupations: Composer; Cellist

Ernest Gillet (13 September 1856 – 6 May 1940) was a French composer and cellist, the brother of oboist and composer Georges Gillet.

== Biography ==
A student at the École Niedermeyer de Paris then of Auguste-Joseph Franchomme at the Conservatoire de Paris, Gillet won the First Prize of the Conservatoire in 1874 and became a cellist of the Orchestre de l'Opéra de Paris (1875–1882). Solo cellist of the Concerts Colonne, the Concerts Lamoureux and the Concerts de Monte-Carlo, Gillet obtained a great success with his operetta La Fille de la mère Michel, with a libretto by Daniel Riche in 1893 as well as with his piece Loin du bal (1888) that can be heard in the feature film The Dancing Masters with Laurel and Hardy in 1943.

== Works ==
Gillet wrote more than four hundred pieces, including:

Operetta

- La Fille de la mère Michel (1893)

Compositions

- Loin du bal (1888)
- Marche burlesque
- Intermezzo
- Entr'acte, gavotte, for violin and piano
- Lejos del baile
- La Lettre de Manon
- Intermezzo lointain
- Babillage
- Cortège du Sardar
- Passepied for cello and piano
- Canzonetta for cello and piano
- Au moulin
- Au village
- Dans la forêt
- Douce caresse
- Doux murmure
- La toupie
- Serenade de Pierrot, pièce de caractère
- Sommeil d'enfant
- Sous l'ombrage
- Pizzicati
- Sérénade impromptu
- Souvenir d'Espagne
- Vous êtes charmante!, valse

== Bibliography ==
- Edmund Sebastian Joseph van der Straeten, History of the Violoncello, the Viol Da Gamba, 1915, p. 537
- Florian Bruyas, Histoire de l'opérette en France, 1855-1965, 1974, (p. 336)
- Oscar Thompson, Bruce Bohle, The International Cyclopedia of Music and Musicians, 1985, p. 822
- Benoît Duteurtre, L'opérette en France, 1997, p. 99, ISBN 978-2213625782
- Maurice Hinson, Wesley Roberts, The Piano in Chamber Ensemble: An Annotated Guide, 2006, p. 630
- Bodewalt Lampe, Stephanie Chase, Popular Classics for Violin and Piano, 2013, p. IX
