= Gustave Goublier =

French conductor and composer (1856–1926)

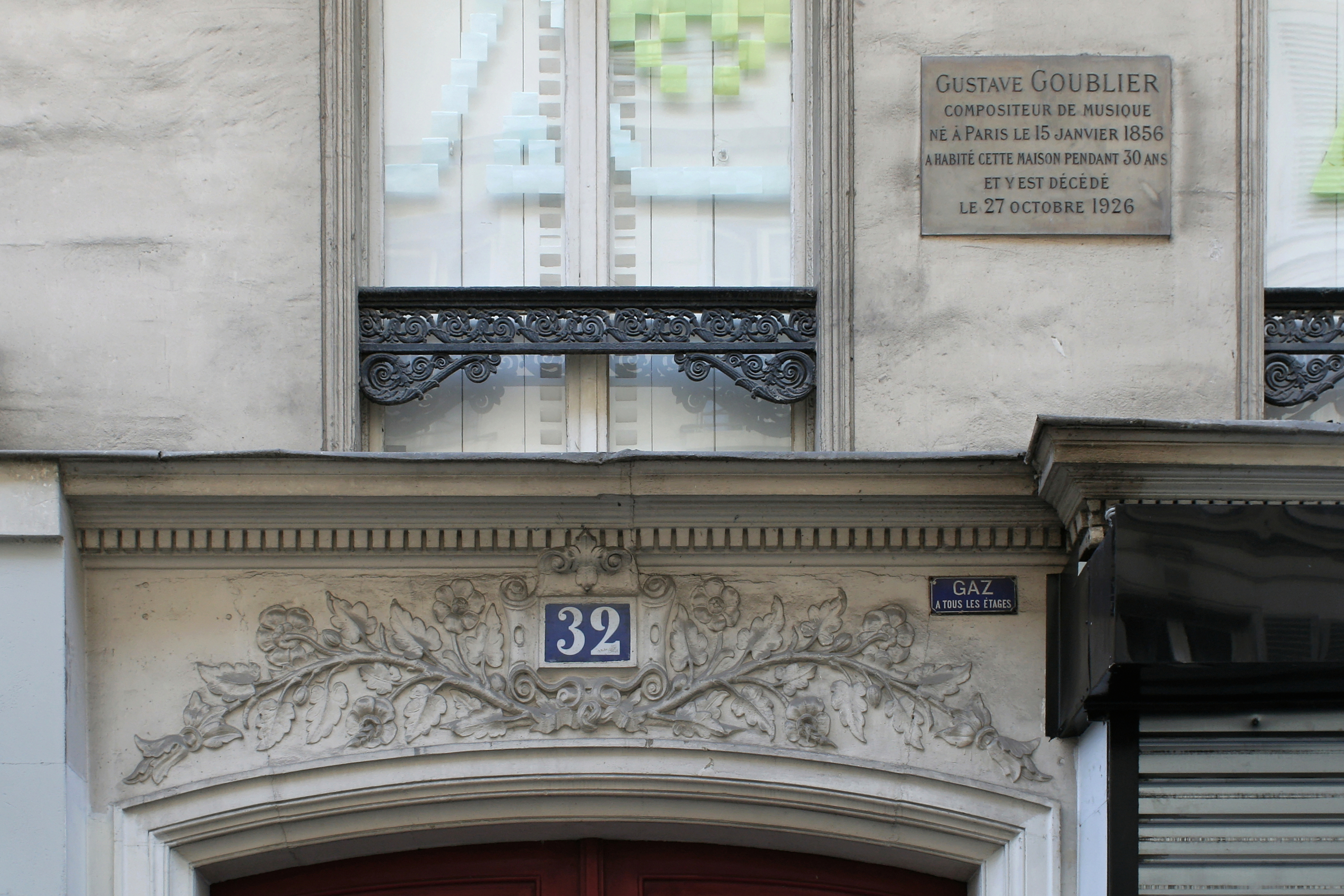
Gustave Goublier lived for 40 years and died 32 rue de l'Échiquier, il Paris.

Gustave Goublier, born Gustave Conin, (15 January 1856, Paris – 27 October 1926, Paris) was a French composer, conductor, and pianist. His younger son was the operetta composer Henri Goublier.

== Career ==
Goublier began his music career working as a pianist and an accompanist in Parisian cafes, hotels, and music halls. During this period, he began working as songwriter as well. He became known for his popular mélodies. These include "La voix des chênes", "L'Angélus de la mer", and "Le Credo du paysan"; the latter two especially being important early hits. In October 1890, his first musical stage work, the one act Chanteur et Pipelot, was mounted in Lille.

As a conductor, Goublier was music director of the El Dorado music hall in Paris for six years. While there his one act musicals Par-devant le notaire (1899), Le Serum de l'amour (1899), and Les Filles de la Belle Helene (1900) were performed there. He left this post to become music director of the Moulin Rouge. He also served as an orchestra conductor at the Parisiana, and Folies Bergère. His most successful work, the operetta Mam'zelle Boy Scout, was given its premiere at the Théâtre de la Renaissance on April 3, 1915. His last work, Ah! Quelle nuit was first performed at the Théâtre des Bouffes du Nord on November 19, 1920.
