= Gustave Vautrey =

French poet and playwright (1855–1923)

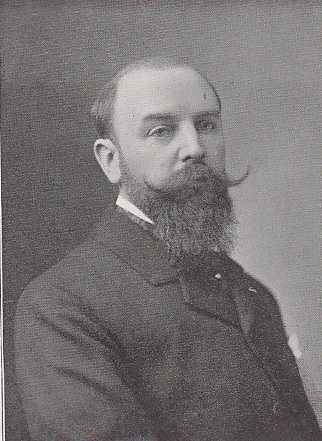
- Gustave Vautrey in 1902
- Born: Émile Henri Gustave Vautrey; 22 June 1855; Paris
- Died: 30 December 1923 (aged 68); Paris
- Occupations: Playwright, poet

Émile Henri Gustave Vautrey (22 June 1855 – 30 December 1923) was a 19th-century French poet and playwright.

A civil servant, his plays were given at the Théâtre de l'Odéon and the Théâtre de Paris.

He was made chevalier of the Légion d'honneur 29 October 1898.

== Works ==
- 1877: L'Obole du voleur, poetry
- 1878: Barcarolle !, poetry
- 1882: Le Mariage de Racine, comedy in 1 act, in verse, with Guillaume Livet
- 1887: Avant la pièce, prologue in verse
- 1894: Ode au général Margueritte
