= Jaap Stotijn =

Dutch oboist (1891–1970)

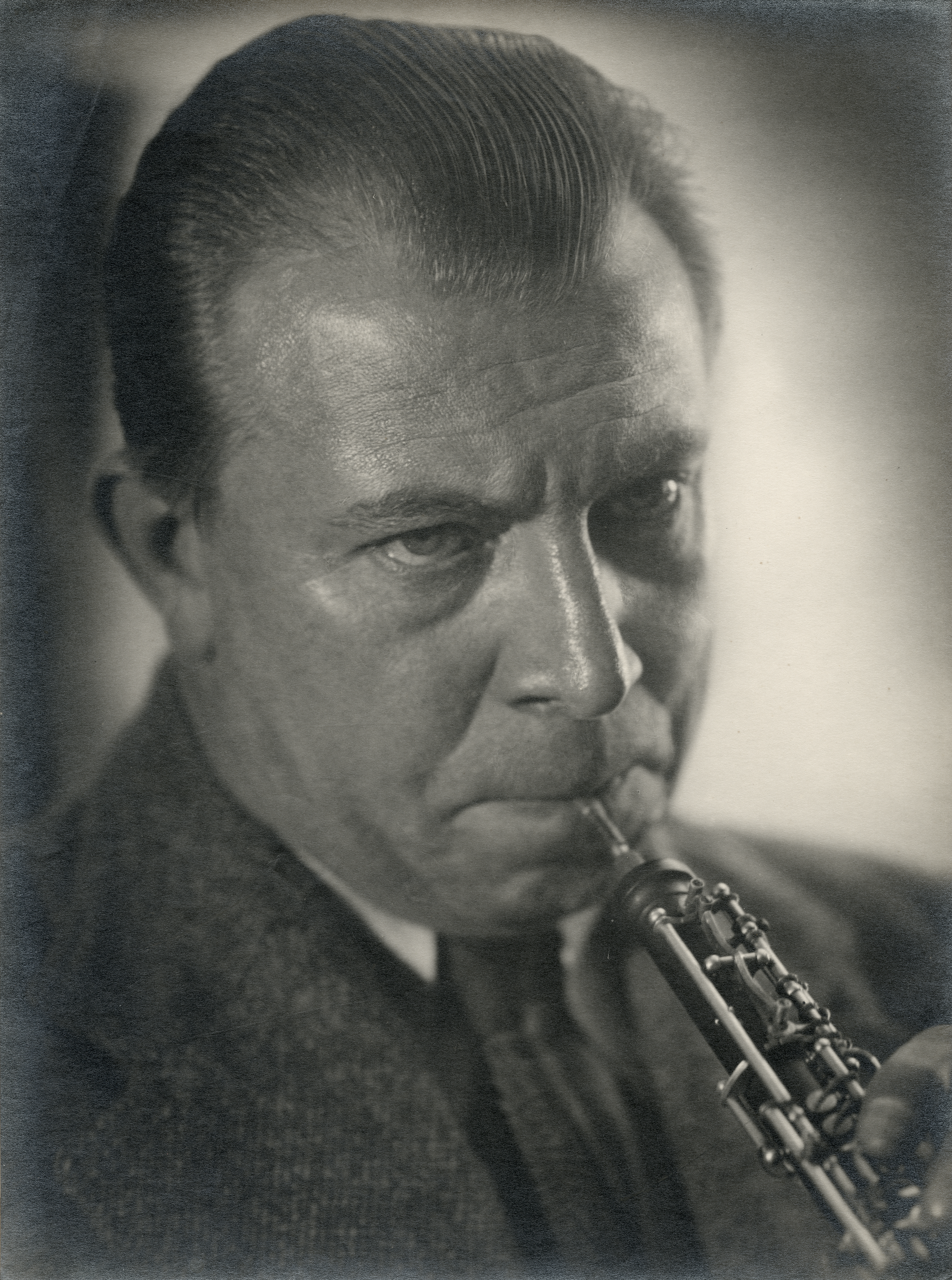
- Jaap Stotijn (photo nl:Franz Ziegler)

Background information
- Born: Jacob Hendrik Stotijn; 22 September 1891; The Hague, Netherlands
- Died: 5 April 1970 (aged 78) The Hague
- Genre: Classical
- Occupation: Instrumentalist
- Instrument: Oboe

Jacob Hendrik "Jaap" Stotijn (The Hague, 22 September 1891 – The Hague, 5 April 1970) was a Dutch oboist. He was also active as a pianist and conductor. Jaap Stotijn has been credited as the founder of the Dutch school of oboe playing. "The Dutch style ... is the product of the distinctive reed-making and playing style of Jaap Stotijn." Contemporary oboists in this lineage include Han de Vries, Koen van Slogteren (nl), Peter Bree, Bart Schneemann, and the current principal oboe in Stotijn's orchestra, Pauline Oostenrijk (nl).

== Personal life ==
Jacob Hendrik Stotijn was born on 22 September 1891, the son of Johannes Louis Stotijn and Helena Kooper. He married Geertruida Molenaar on 27 September 1912. They had a daughter, Ellen, born 23 March 1913, and a son, Haakon, born 11 February 1915. Ellen Nicasie-Stotijn became a harpist, and Haakon Stotijn followed his father as an oboist and teacher of the oboe.

== Career ==
In 1907, while studying with Dirk van Emmerik, Stotijn played second oboe with the Residentie Orchestra in The Hague, where his teacher was principal oboist. He studied at De Haagsche Muziekschool, now the Royal Conservatory of The Hague from 1910 to 1915.

In 1919, Stotijn succeeded Dirk van Emmerik as solo oboist with the Hague Residentie Orchestra and as oboe instructor at the conservatory, positions he held until his retirement in 1956. He continued to teach oboe privately for many years after his retirement.

Jaap Stotijn was involved in a number of other musical endeavours. In 1928, he began conducting the Hague Workers Symphony Orchestra. In 1935, Stotijn formed the Feltkamp-Stotijn-Ketting Trio with flutist Johan Feltkamp and pianist/composer Piet Ketting. Stotijn also performed with a Baroque music ensemble Collegium Musicum Artis Antiqua.

Composer Julius Röntgen dedicated his Sonata #2 for Oboe and Piano in D major to Stotijn.

== Recordings ==
- Stotijn's recording of Wolfgang Amadeus Mozart's Oboe Concerto in C major, K. 314, with the Wiener Philharmoniker conducted by Wilhelm Loibner has been reissued on some classical compilations.
- Stotijn is almost certainly the oboe soloist heard at the beginning of the second movement in a 1949 recording of Ginette Neveu playing the Violin Concerto in D major, Op. 77, by Johannes Brahms with the Residentie Orchestra conducted by Antal Dorati, also available on reissue.

== Bibliography ==
- "Muziekencyclopedie - Jaap Stotijn". Muziekencyclopedie. Dutch Institute for Sound and Vision.
- de Jonge, A.W.J. (12 November 2013). "Stotijn, Jacob Hendrik (1891-1970)". Biographical Dictionary of the Netherlands: 1880-2000 (in Dutch). Huygens ING, Den Haag.
