= Emmy Wegener =

Dutch musician (1901–1975)

Emmy Heil Frensel-Wegener (14 June 1901 in Amsterdam – 11 January 1973 in Laren (North Holland) was a Dutch violinist, pianist, poet and composer.

== Life and career ==
Wegener was the daughter of composer Bertha Frensel Wegener-Koopman and American insurance agent John Frensel-Wegener. She studied at the music school in Bussum and then in England, then continued her studies at the Conservatory in Amsterdam where she received a degree in violin with Felice Togni. She also studied composition with Sem Dresden, clarinet with Willem Brohm and Gregorian chant.

In 1926 Wegener married Jan Heil, but the couple divorced in 1932. In 1934 she served on the jury for the evaluation of vocal quartet a cappella compositions for the Dutch Association for Contemporary Music, along with Hendrik Andriessen, Henk Badings, Anthon van der Horst and Daniel Ruyneman, but the jury awarded no first prize, finding no "composition of exemplary meaning" among the 47 submissions.

In 1935 Wegener experienced a serious illness that progressed to paralysis by 1950. She wrote at least one poem which appeared in De Nieuwe Gids. The city of Gorinchem named a street after her.

== Works ==
Wegener composed works for orchestra, chamber ensemble, piano and voice, which The New Grove described as "in a dissonant, neo-classical style." Her works date mainly from 1925 to 1935, when illness reduced her output. Selected works include:

- 1925: Sonate
- 1925: Suite voor twee violen
- 1926: Hobosuite (ooit uitgevoerd door Jaap Stotijn en Gerard Hengelveld)
- 1927: Sonate in een deel voor cello en piano
- 1927: Sextet (fluit, hobo, klarinet, fagot, hoorn en piano)
- 1928: Ik zag Cecilia voor zangstem en begeleiding
- 1928: Gekwetst ben ik voor drie sopranen, twee alten, twee tenoren en twee bassen
- 1929: Suite voor orkest
- 1929: Drie stukken voor viool en piano
- 1929: Strijkkwartet
- 1929: Menuetto voor hobo en piano
- 1930: Rapsodie voor piano en orkest
- 1930: Twee stukken voor piano solo
- Suite voor klarinet en piano, dat tot in Boedapest te horen is geweest
- Toccata voor piano solo
- 1929: Dans voor klarinet en orkest, uitgevoerd in Geneve onder leiding van Ernest Ansermet tijdens het ISCM
- 1932: Shakespeare-suite, op 7 februari 1932 uitgevoerd door het Concertgebouworkest onder leiding van Pierre Monteux.
- 1949: Donumus
