= Han de Vries =

Dutch oboist (born 1941)

Han Samuel de Vries (born 31 August 1941, The Hague), is a Dutch oboist and is considered the doyen of the Dutch school of oboe playing.

He studied oboe with Jaap Stotijn at the Royal Conservatory of The Hague and with his son Haakon Stotijn at the Sweelinck Conservatory in Amsterdam. He won many prizes in his youth, including the Prix d'Excellence in 1962. He was a founding member of the Netherlands Wind Ensemble in 1960.

In 1963, at the age of 22, he became principal oboist at the Royal Concertgebouw Orchestra. He remained with the Concertgebouw Orchestra for seven years, after which he focused on chamber music and a solo career. He was a member of the Netherlands Chamber Orchestra and in 1973 he joined the Danzi (Wind) Quintet. Instigated by Frans Brüggen, De Vries has played baroque oboe besides the modern oboe since 1970, at which time this was still unusual.

In 1964, he was appointed professor at the Sweelinck Conservatory, where he subsequently taught for almost three decades. Among his students have been Christopher Bouwman, Peter Bree, Frank van Koten, Wolfgang Lange, and Bart Schneemann. Later he limited himself to giving masterclasses.

As a soloist, De Vries has toured Europe, Japan, Australia, and North and South America, with a repertory of baroque, classical, romantic and contemporary music. He has made many recordings, one of which (of the oboe sonatas of Schumann, Bartók, Ben Haim, Poulenc and Shinohara with pianist Rudolf Jansen) won an Edison Award in 1973.

Among the composers who have dedicated music to him are Louis Andriessen (Anachronie II, musique d’ameublement ("furniture music"), to the memory of Erik Satie. 1969), Peter Schat (Theme op. 21, 1970), Bruno Maderna (Oboe Concerto No. 3, 1973), Morton Feldman (Oboe and Orchestra, 1976), and Willem Breuker (Oboe Concertos Nos. 1 and 2, 1992, 2000). Most of these pieces employ unorthodox techniques for oboe like multiphonics, fluttertonguing, and glissandi, as if to emphasize De Vries' wide range from baroque to postmodern music.

De Vries has a deep interest in the history of oboes and oboe music. He assembled a large collection of historical oboes which is now at the Rijksmuseum in Amsterdam. He also has edited Baroque oboe repertoire, published previously unpublished old oboe music, and pursued lost oboe music like Beethoven's oboe concerto.

In 1997, he was named an Officer in the Order of Orange-Nassau.

Two CD boxes contain his recorded legacy: Han de Vries – The Radio Recordings (Oboe Classics CC 2024, 9CDs + 2 DVDs) was released in 2011 to mark his 70th birthday, and Han de Vries – The almost last recordings (Attacca Records 2016.148, 18 CDs + 1 DVD) was released in 2016 to mark his 75th birthday.

== Recordings ==
- Bellini, Hummel, Kalliwoda: Romantische Oboenkonzerte, EMI Electrola C 063-24591 LP. 1973.
- Han de Vries – The Romantic Oboe, with the Amsterdam Philharmonic Orchestra, conducted by Anton Kersjes, Playing Bellini, Hummel and Kalliwoda, Recorded 1973 Bovema EMI/ * WRC-EMI NZ -_EMD 5505 /1975
- Vivaldi, Krebs, Händel, Telemann, Babell: Werken voor Hobo en Orgel, Han de Vries, Albert de Klerk His Master's Voice, 1A 037-25231 LP, 1976.
- Schumann, Bartók, Ben-Haim, Poulenc, Shinohara: Han de Vries – Hobo, Oboe. Rudolf Jansen, piano His Master's Voice C 053-24585 LP, 1976.
- Albinoni: Four Oboe Concertos Op. 9, Nos. 2,5,8 & 11, EMI Angel LP, 1981.
- Cimarosa, Pergolesi, Corelli, Scarlatti, Zipoli, Tartini: Werken voor hobo en strijkorkest. EMI 065-26683 LP, 1981.
- Bach: Arias from Cantatas for Soprano, Oboe and B.C., Elly Ameling, EMI 1270581 LP, 1983.
- Mozart: Ode Aan Amadeus, Deel 2. Philips 830 373-1 LP, 1986.
- Telemann: Oboenkonzerte & -Sonaten, Alma Musica Amsterdam, EMI CDM 7 63068-2 CD (Reflexe), 1989.
- Apassionato. Mercury 8421 302 CD, 1990. (Mercury 8421 301 LP, 1989)
- De Vries & Zoon. Mercury 5129 252 CD, 1992.
- Louis Andriessen: Nocturnen. Ittrospezione III. Concept II). Anachronie I. Contra Tempus. Anachronie II, (Han de Vries, bassoon), Composers' Voice CV54 CD, 1996.
- The Art of Han de Vries, Oboe Classics CC2004, 2002
- Han de Vries – The Radio Recordings, Oboe Classics CC2024, 2011
