= Danzi Quintet =

Dutch musical group

The Danzi Quintet was a Dutch wind quintet, one of the most highly regarded quintets active in the 1960s and 1970s

The quintet took its name from the 18th/19th-century composer Franz Danzi (a notable early composer of wind quintets), and was founded in 1956 or 1957 by the flutist Frans Vester. It was composed of members of the Concertgebouw and Dutch Opera Orchestras, and was initially formed in order to perform the Dutch premiere of Arnold Schoenberg's Wind Quintet, op. 26, which they did—after 107 rehearsals over the course of a year—at the 1958 Holland Festival. The other founding members of the quintet were Leo Driehuys (oboe), Pem Godri (clarinet), Brian Pollard (bassoon), and Adriaan van Woudenberg (horn). Vester played in the quintet for the entire period of its existence and was also its artistic director. Koen van Slogteren soon took over the position of oboist, and shortly afterward Piet Honingh became the clarinetist. Slogteren remained until 1971. He was succeeded by Maarten Karres, then in 1973 by Han de Vries, and later by Jan Spronk.

The Danzi Quintet acquired international fame, especially for their performances of contemporary music.

Many composers wrote works for the Danzi Quintet, amongst others Rob du Bois (Chants en contrepoints, 1962 and Réflexions sur le jour où Pérotin le Grand ressuscitera, 1969), Peter Schat (Improvisations and Symphonies, opus 11, 1960), Ton de Leeuw (Antiphony, for wind quintet and four-channel tape, 1960), Misha Mengelberg (Omtrent een componistenactie, 1966), Josef Tal (Wind Quintet, 1966), and Jan van Vlijmen (Second Wind Quintet, 1972).

== Sources ==
- Keller, Hans (August 1958). "Reports from Abroad: Holland Festival". The Musical Times. 99 (1386): 449–450.
- Schat, Peter, and Rudolf Escher. 1992. Peter Schat, Rudolph Escher: brieven, 1958–1961, edited by Erik Voermans. Bibliotheek Nederlandse muziek 3. Hilversum: Centrum Netherlandse Muziek; Zutphen: Walburg Pers. ISBN 90-6011-786-7.
- Thomson, J[ohn] M[ansfield] (May 1985). "Concerning the Flute by Rien de Reede". Early Music. 13 (2): 289–291. doi:10.1093/earlyj/13.2.289.

Footnotes
