= Netherlands Wind Ensemble =

Dutch classical wind group

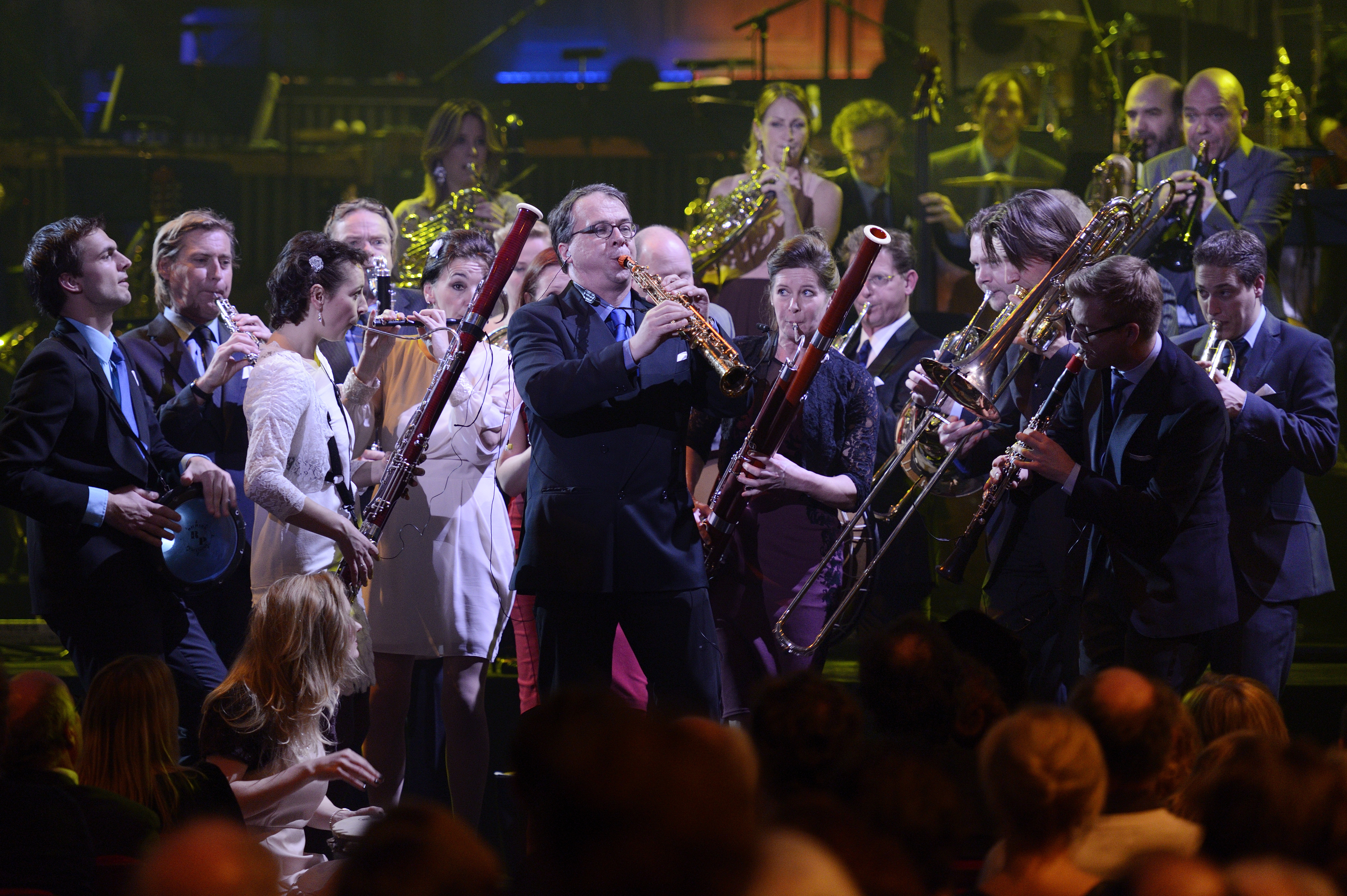
Netherlands Wind Ensemble

The Netherlands Wind Ensemble (Dutch: Nederlands Blazers Ensemble, NBE) is a wind ensemble composed of musicians from major Dutch symphony orchestras.

The NBE performs concert series at Amsterdam’s major venues: the Concertgebouw, Paradiso and the new Muziekgebouw aan 't IJ, and tours abroad twice per season. The artistic leader of the ensemble is oboist Bart Schneemann.

== History ==
The ensemble was founded in 1959 by Thom de Klerk (1912–1966), principal bassoonist of the Concertgebouw Orchestra who had formed a student wind quintet at the Amsterdam Conservatory consisting of Martine Bakker (flute), Edo de Waart (oboe), George Pieterson (clarinet), Joep Terwey (bassoon) and Jaap Verhaar (horn). De Klerk wanted to expand the group to perform wind serenades like those by Mozart, Dvorak and Gounod, and aimed to make the ensemble into the "I Musici" for winds. The core of the NBE was a wind octet (pairs of oboes, clarinets, bassoons, and horns), but the ensemble usually expanded to larger dimensions. When De Klerk died in October 1966, Edo de Waart, who had left in 1962 to focus on conducting, took over his role (Han de Vries and Werner Herbers succeeded him as oboists). In this period, the ensemble made many recordings, and multiple composers wrote music for the group. Both De Waart and De Vries left in 1975. The NBE adjusted to play without a conductor while Joep Terwey and Werner Herbers acted as managers. From 1985 to 1988, Nikolaus Harnoncourt joined as conductor. In 1988, the NBE reorganized with many younger players and Bart Schneemann (a student of Han de Vries) taking over the artistic management.

== Programs ==
In the past years, the NBE has created and performed many original programs focusing on a particular composer or soloist. Kevin Volans, Roger Doyle, Alexander Raskatov, Carmen Linares, Guido Morini, Luca Francesconi, Cornelis de Bondt, Theo Loevendie, Guus Janssen, John Psathas, Maarten Altena, Martijn Padding, Ayub Ogada, Iva Bittova, the Pokrovsky Ensemble, the Hilliard Ensemble, Jordi Savall, Marco Beasley, Aynur Dogan and Manos Akhalinotopoulos have all been featured in this way.

In addition, the NBE regularly stages programs like Mail from Mozart, which alternates the seven parts of Mozart’s ‘Gran Partita’ with readings from his letters to his father; Schumann’s Diary, which tells the story of Schumann's deteriorating mental health through passages from his diary and new interpretations of his piano works by Dutch composer Otto Ketting; or The Creation, which takes, as its point of departure, an 18th-century version of Joseph Haydn’s Die Schöpfung but frames it with an updated Creation myth by Flemish author Bart Moeyaert.

Around the Mozart year 2006, the NBE staged Le Nozze di Figaro, Die Zauberflöte and Cosi fan Tutte as a trio of original chamber operas performed on period instruments and featuring the voices of soprano Johannette Zomer and baritone Frans Fiselier.

The traditional New Year's Concert started in 1972 and since 1995 has been broadcast live on television from the Concertgebouw in Amsterdam.

The Nederlands Blazers Ensemble collaborated with Iranian singer Mohsen Namjoo on the project Voices from the East. The collaboration was recorded as Voices from the East (Live), released in 2017.

== CDs ==
The NBE has recorded CDs for two major international labels: Philips and Britain's Chandos. In November 1999, the NBE started its own record label, NBELIVE which annually releases two or three live recordings of special NBE projects. In 2007, the NBELIVE CD Gran Partita, a live recording of Mozart's Serenade for Winds, received an Edison Award.
