= Thom de Klerk =

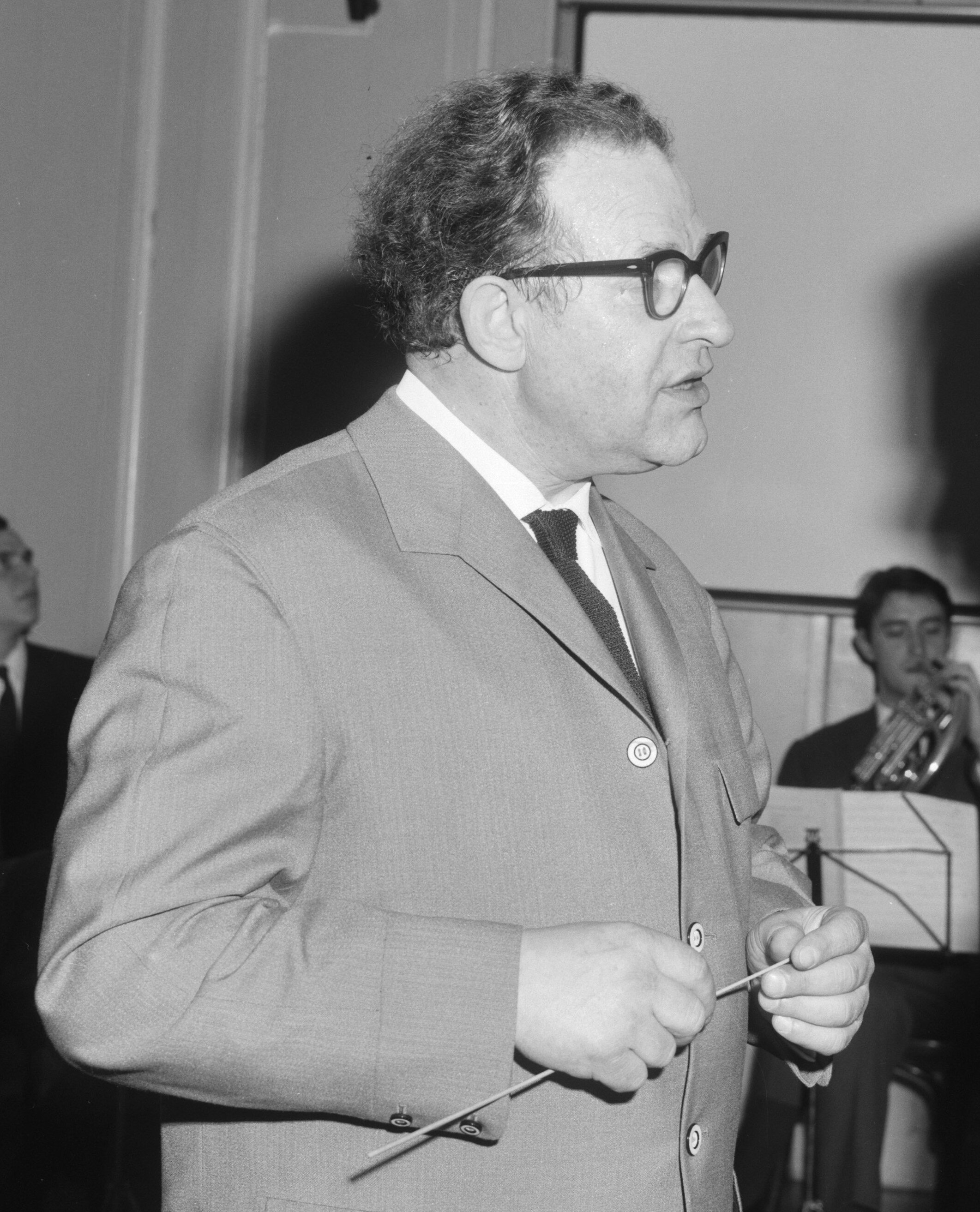
Thom de Klerk in 1964

Thom de Klerk (Thomas Johannes Josephus) (10 May 1912, The Hague, Netherlands – 13 October 1966, Abcoude). Dutch bassoonist, double reed maker, music teacher, conductor and music director. Thom de Klerk was the first solo bassoonist of the Royal Concertgebouw Orchestra from 1935 until 1966. He was successful with the directors Willem Mengelberg, Eduard van Beinum and Bernard Haitink. Guest directors like Eugen Jochum, Arturo Toscanini and Pierre Monteux made special requests for his presence in the orchestra.

== Study ==
Thom de Klerk studied at the Royal Conservatorium in The Hague with Jacq. Poons, an old school teacher who let his pupils study musical scales for hours on end. Some of Poons’s other pupils were David Meyer and Louis Stotijn, who both later became solo bassoonists in the Residentie Orchestra in the Hague. In 1935 Thom de Klerk, aged twenty-three, won the appointment to first solo bassoonist with the Royal Concertgebouw Orchestra under the direction of Willem Mengelberg.

== Building bassoons ==
Just after the Second World War, de Klerk was invited to be a consultant to the renowned builder of music instruments Cabart in Paris. The story goes that during the Second World War the Nazis had forced the French oboe factory Cabart to build German bassoons, though the archive proving or disproving this account was lost. The bassoons produced after the Second World War upon approval received the hallmark Cabart/de Klerk.

In 1950, Thom de Klerk started his own bassoon atelier on the top floor of his home in Amsterdam. Later, he expanded into a larger atelier in the very heart of that city on a historical street called the Nes, where the Flemish Cultural Centre has now been built. The number of bassoons produced in total remained modest though. The talents of Thom de Klerk were many, however being a business man was not one of them. He left the day-to-day running of the business to his in-laws and the bassoon atelier went bankrupt in 1952.

== Bassoonist ==
De Klerk was an extrovert and he did not hide the extremities of his character. Living his life boldly, at least in the eyes of the average person of the fifties, which according to de Klerk’s son Thomas was perhaps rooted in his insecure home life as a child. His father once told him the story that once as a child he came home from school to discover that his parents had moved house! Possibly also due to his unstable upbringing Thom de Klerk was not the most easy going person to work with - some bassoonists were not prepared to play in the same group.

Professionally and emotionally moved he was a fervent admirer of the works of Mozart. ‘For Mozart I gladly play to the angels in heaven,’ he said more than once. On the other hand, he was outspoken in his disapproval of the works of Anton Bruckner: ‘Ten measly notes in those damned almost never-ending symphonies,’ he exclaimed once in despair, his remedy being to fall asleep on stage during some of these concerts between those scarce notes. When a particular ostinato in the music was played or when the timpani were played in a certain sequence he had trained himself to wake up to perform his part meticulously, after which he again dozed off. This kind of behaviour could drive his fellow musicians to despair.

There is a particular anecdote that de Klerk once at rehearsals came on stage without his bassoon when the conductor Willem Mengelberg asked him, ‘Why don’t you play, Mister de Klerk?’ to which de Klerk replied, ‘My bassoon is at the pawn shop, if you give me some money, I will play again.’ He frequently got away with this typical de Klerk behaviour, because in company he usually had humour on his side - that was the kind of person he was. Though Thom de Klerk almost routinely manifested himself to be perhaps a polemical person, his former pupils, amongst whom Joep Terweij, will still not hear one iota of the reputed controversial attitude.

For an extremely gifted person like Thom de Klerk the provincial fifties atmosphere of his home country proved too small a basis to thrive. He felt more appreciated in the United States and the United Kingdom, or in Germany where culture was not the last entry in the book keeping of the realm, where a musician of his stature was addressed with the esteemed title of Herr Professor. How shrill and stinging the contrast was with the gossip in the neighbourhood in Amsterdam where he lived with his family, where it was whispered he probably was a criminal or a burglar because he always left home in the evening carrying a suitcase.

The recognition and acknowledgement of his unique way of playing the bassoon not only spread worldwide geographically but also in time. His name still produces many hits with all kinds of search engines, amongst which many testimonials of former pupils, now masters in their own right, who regard him and refer to him as their master.

== Reed making ==
Apart from all the talents and qualities Thom de Klerk had, he also made outstanding reeds. In the wake of the international tours with the Royal Concertgebouw Orchestra de Klerk gathered an international clientele for his reeds, very unusual for that time. He never thought about the financial returns this trade could get him. As said, he was not much of a business person. Being able to craft superior double reeds provided Thom de Klerk with the basis for the exceptional clear and tuneful sound of his bassoon play. In its turn his sound was among other elements the basis for his accomplishment and success as a bassoonist.

== Recordings ==
It was not at all customary in his days to record albums, so there are just two solo recordings known, apart from the many recordings he made as a member of the Royal Concertgebouw Orchestra. The two are: Mozart’s Sinfonia Concertante in Es-dur, KV 297b (Anh. 9) by the Concertgebouw Quartet of which de Klerk was the bassoonist, accompanied by the Netherlands Chamber Orchestra under the direction of Szymon Goldberg. This recording is still available on cd in the series Philips Classic Productions, volume 37 (Philips 462 552-2). Furthermore, Mozart’s Bassoon Concerto B-dur, KV 191 accompanied by the Vienna Symphony Orchestra under the direction of Bernard Paumgartner (Fontana 894 053 ZKY & Philips 839 517 VGY). In all three parts of the concerto Thom de Klerk replaced Mozart’s cadenzas with cadenzas of his own making, which earned him much acclaim with the critics - the cadenzas are still studied today. Another peculiarity of this recording is that each movement of the concerto was recorded in just one take. The Fontana label has been acquired by Philips in turn acquired by Universal Classics. Possibly this company will republish this concerto in 2012 at the one hundredth birthday of Thom de Klerk. For the time being this concerto has been digitally remastered and privately published by his son Thomas.

== The Netherlands Wind Ensemble ==
Besides being a bassoon player, bassoon maker and reed maker Thom de Klerk also was a music teacher at the Conservatorium van Amsterdam, the Sweelinck Academy. He was a teacher of, of course, the bassoon and also of the ensemble class. In this last capacity he was able to select the best students, among others Joep Terweij (bassoon), Martine Bakker (flute), George Pieterson (clarinet), Jaap Verhaar (French horn) and Edo de Waart (oboe). With these students he founded the Aulos Wind Ensemble, a group he expounded in 1959 and renamed the Netherlands Wind Ensemble.

Being the founder, conductor and artistic director of the Netherlands Wind Ensemble Thom de Klerk has made ground-breaking achievements in rediscovering manuscripts the great composers wrote for wind ensembles and that were thought lost or that were forgotten over time. To this end he travelled the world to research the music libraries. He also retreaded many works for string ensembles to fit the requirements of a wind ensemble. Until the foundation of the Netherlands Wind Ensemble wind ensembles were a rarity, also worldwide. In the Netherlands only the Concertgebouw Quartet and Quintet existed, both of which de Klerk was the bassoonist. It was de Klerk’s aim with the Netherlands Wind Ensemble to create the wind-counterpart of the world-famous Italian string chamber orchestra I Musici which was founded seven years earlier. Within a relative short period of time under the artistic direction of Thom de Klerk the Netherlands Wind Ensemble achieved prominent international acclaim.

In the time frame he considered ending his work for the Royal Concertgebouw Orchestra to be able to dedicate all of his energy to music - and archive research and the artistic - and music direction of the Netherlands Wind Ensemble, at fifty-four years old Thom de Klerk unexpectedly died.
