= Leon Sametini =

American violin virtuoso and teacher of Dutch origin (1886–1944)

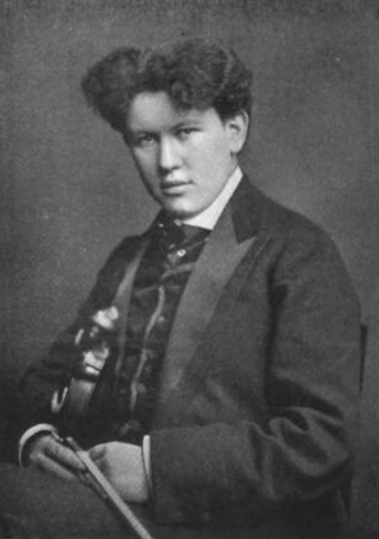
- In The King and His Navy and Army, 25 March 1905
- Born: 16 March 1886; Rotterdam, Netherlands
- Died: 20 August 1944 (aged 58); Chicago, Illinois, US
- Occupations: Violinist, pedagogue

Leon Sametini (16 March 1886 – 20 August 1944) was an American virtuoso violinist and music pedagogue who originated from Rotterdam, Holland. Sametini was born to Samual Sametini and Rose De Groot. He initially studied violin in the Netherlands with his uncle, M. De Groot, and from 1892 until he was 10 years of age with Dutch violinist Felice Togni and Bram Eldering at the Amsterdam Conservatoire. In 1902, Sametini went to Prague to study violin for one year with Otakar Ševčík. He also studied with notable teacher Eugène Ysaÿe.

When I was twelve years old, my great teacher Leon Sametini told me to focus my attention on my bow arm. 'Your left hand is a machine,' he said. 'Your right hand produces tone and nuance, and adds style to your playing.'

— Aaron Rosand Life lessons

As a violin virtuoso, Sametini gave concert tours from which he became well known in Europe, particularly in the Netherlands, Belgium, England and Austria. He was a protégé of Queen Wilhelmina of the Netherlands who enabled him to continue his studies in Prague under Otakar Ševčík and she gave him a violin made in 1730 by the Venetian luthier Sancto Seraphin.

Sametini was a notable violin teacher. Whilst in London he taught Isolde Menges, an English violinist. He eventually settled in Chicago, where he was head of the violin department at the Chicago Musical College. Whilst director of violin, he taught notable students such as Silvestre Revueltas, Aaron Rosand, Harry Adaskin, Oliver Colbentson and Guila Bustabo, who studied with Sametini from the age of five.

On 20 August 1944, Sametini was admitted to the Grant Hospital, Chicago, where he died of a sudden heart attack.
