= Bertha Frensel Wegener =

Dutch composer and music educator

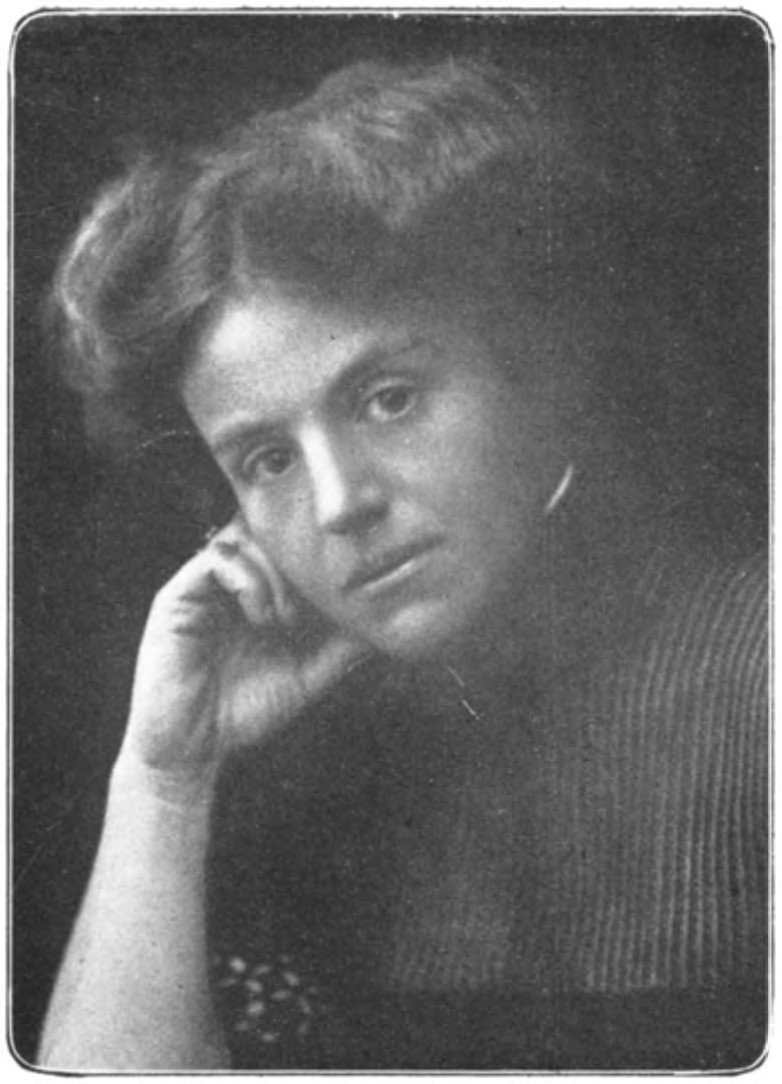
Bertha Frensel Wegener

Bertha Frensel Wegener-Koopman (27 September 1874, in Bloemendaal – 17 July 1953, in Amsterdam) was a Dutch composer and music educator.

== Biography ==
Bertha Koopman studied composition and piano at the Amsterdam Conservatory and continued studying with composer Bernard Zweers and vocal pedagogue Hugo Bellwidt in Frankfurt. After completing her studies, she performed concerts in Germany and the Netherlands.

Koopman married Jolen Frensel Wegener and retired from the concert stage to a career as accompanist, teacher and composer in Haarlem. Koopman's early songs included German lyrics, but after World War I, she wrote her songs in French and English, which allowed her access to markets in New York City, Chicago and St. Louis. Her daughter Emmy Frensel Wegener (1901–1973) was a violinist and composer of chamber music.

== Works ==
Selected works include:

- Vier Lieder including Stabat Mater (1909)
- Dream-woman, song for soprano with piano accompaniment (1914)
- Love Songs for soprano and piano on texts by Rabindranath Tagore (1916)
- Eight Lieder für eine Mittlere Stimme mit Klavierbegleitung (1909)
- Deux Chansons
- Drei Lieder
- Nursery Songs (1926)
- Four songs including a cart on the sandy road driving
- At Holland's Resurrection (after May 1945)

== Discography ==
Recordings of Frensel Wegener-Koopman's songs have been issued on CD, including:

- Frensel Wegener Bertha Koopman - Songs, performed by Ingrid Kappelle and Miklos Schwalb. Tatlin Records, TA 001.
- Henriëtte Bosmans and her circle by Henriëtte Bosmans, Lex Van Delden, Willem Pijper, and Bertha Frensel Wegener-Koopman (Audio CD - May 22, 2006), Globe. ASIN: B000026ARU
