= Felice Togni =

Dutch violinist and pedagogue (1871–1929)

Felice Togni (Filitz Charles Antonius)
- Born: 3 October 1871; Zwolle, Netherlands
- Died: 31 October 1929 (aged 58) Haarlem, Netherlands
- Occupations: Violinist, teacher
- Instrument: Violin
- Spouse: Maria Bertha Helene Kretzschmar

Filitz Charles Antonius "Felice" Togni (Zwolle, 3 October 1871 – Haarlem, 31 October 1929) was a Dutch violinist and violin pedagogue.

== Life ==
Togni was the eldest son of Anton Albertus Felix Simonius Togni and Anna Maria Hubertina de France, who lived in Koningsplein. In 1901, he, himself married Maria Bertha Helene Kretzschmar from Essen.

== Education ==
His initial violin teacher was André van Riemsdijk (1848–1904), a graduate of the Liège Conservatory and student of virtuoso Hubert Léonard (1819–1890). Togni later studied with Richter, Kramer, Timmner and Willem Kes.

Togni played first violin in the Concertgebouw Orchestra, later becoming leader of the second violins.

In 1914 he became head teacher of the Conservatory of Music for the Promotion of Music in Amsterdam. Among his more notable students were Sem Dresden, Gerard Boedijn, Jan Felderhof, Annie Pothuis, Cor Kint, Joachim Röntgen, Nap de Klijn, and Emmy Wegener. He also taught Leon Sametini, who went on to become a virtuoso violinist and composer.

As an experienced violin teacher, Togni wrote a series of 3 books of scalic exercises and chordal method which were published by Messrs. Breitkopf & Härtel, Leipzig, under the title The Development of the Left Hand (Die Ausbildung der Linken Hand).

== Works ==
- 12 Caprices for Violin – Pierre Rode / (Revised by Felice Togni)
- 24 Caprices for Violin – Pierre Rode / (Revised by Felice Togni) – Leipzig
- 24 Studies (Etüden Matinées) for Violin – Pierre Gaviniès / (Revised by Felice Togni)
- Studies for the Violin forming 36 Caprices – Federigo Fiorillo / (Revised by Felice Togni)
- Cavatine for Violin (Viola or Cello) with Piano accomp., Op. 85 No. 3 – Joachim Raff (Revised by Felice Togni)
- Six Sonatinas for Pianoforte and Violin (or Flute), Op. 20 – Jan Ladislav Dussek (Revised by Felice Togni)
- De Ontwikkelingsgang der Vioolspel- en Vioolbouwkunst, 1924 (Felice Togni)
- De Eerste Ontwikkeling van de Techniek der Linkerhand (Felice Togni)
- Le Mecanisme de la Double-Corde du Violon (Felice Togni)
