= Rob du Bois =

Dutch musician

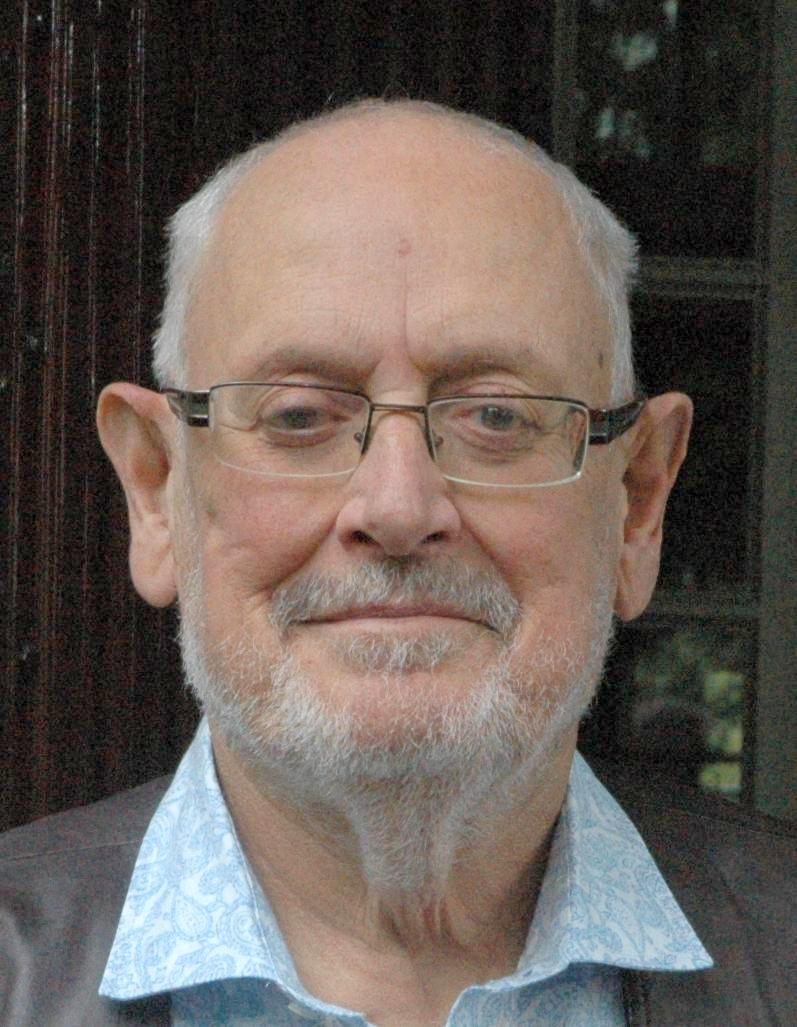
Rob du Bois in 2012

Rob du Bois (28 May 1934 – 28 August 2013) was a Dutch composer, pianist, and jurist.

== Background and education ==
Rob (Robert Louis) du Bois was born in Amsterdam. His French ancestry can be seen from his name, and he maintained a sympathy for the French mentality and language. After graduating from the Vossius Gymnasium in Amsterdam he studied law at the Gemeentelijke Universiteit in the same city. He began studying music with Chris Rabé at the Volksmuziekschool, later taking piano lessons, initially with Hans Sachs, and later with T. Hart Nibbrig–de Graeff. He decided to become a composer after hearing two symphonies by Matthijs Vermeulen in 1949. As a composer he was self-taught, with influences especially from his contact during the 1950s with the composers Kees van Baaren and Daniel Ruyneman.

== Musician ==
In 1959, Bois became associated with the group of composers formed around the Gaudeamus Foundation, of which he later became a board member. He first became known outside of Holland as a composer when his music was performed at the Zagreb Biennale and the Warsaw Autumn, in both 1967 and 1969, and at the Festival of the International Society for Contemporary Music in 1967 in Prague.

In the late 1960s, Bois became a performing member of the ICP, which had been founded in 1967 by saxophonist Willem Breuker, pianist Misha Mengelberg, and drummer Han Bennink. It was for Breuker that du Bois composed the Breuker Concerto in 1967, a work for two clarinets, four saxophones, and 21 strings, which was premiered by Breuker with the Rotterdam Philharmonic Orchestra. Du Bois played keyboards in a number of ICP projects, including Breuker’s grandiose February 1969 “happening”, Mozart Opera, which also featured Derek Bailey on guitar, Paul Rutherford and Willem van Manen on trombones, and Han Bennink on drums. In 1972, du Bois alternated with Louis Andriessen in the ensemble that accompanied viola soloist Lodewijk de Boer in performances of Breuker's Speelplan for viola, seven instruments, and live electronics, the latter performed by Michel Waisvisz Bois also participated in recordings of Breuker’s music—mostly incidental music for various theatre productions—by the ICP and other groups between 1968 and 1977. Some of these were released on LP in the early 1970s, and some others more recently on a CD on Breuker’s BVHaast label.

For Dutch composers of Bois's generation, the search for a politically and socially engaged music has been of paramount importance. A number of Bois’s more militant colleagues began staging public protests, the most widely reported being the Nutcracker Action on 17 November 1969 when demonstrators disrupted a performance by the Concertgebouw Orchestra, whose activities they claimed were “maintaining an undemocratic artistic environment”. Many of the demonstrators, such as Louis Andriessen, Reinbert de Leeuw, Misha Mengelberg, and Peter Schat were Bois’s close friends and, a month or two after the Nutcracker Action, Bois led—together with Konrad Boehmer and Sytze Smit—working groups mobilised under the general leadership of Mengelberg in support of "a radical and democratic renewal of musical life".

In May 1972, Bois's music was performed by Willem Breuker and Louis Andriessen’s Orkest de Volharding, which had been formed in the wake of the 1969 anti-establishment Nutcracker Action with the object of taking contemporary music out of the concert halls and bringing it directly to ordinary people who never frequent such places. Du Bois's Springtime for ten winds and piano (1978) was composed for de Volharding.

In 1976, the ensemble ICÉ from Hilversum, led by Will Eisma, with bass-clarinet soloist Harry Sparnaay, took Bois's composition Heliotrope (for a soloist and an optional number of accompanists, 1967) to the Wittinger Tage für neue Kammermusik, where Sparnaay created a sensation (Diederichs-Lafite 1976, 383). Bois created a number of other works especially for Sparnaay: Chemin for solo bass clarinet (1971), Fusion voor deux for bass clarinet and piano, and Iguanodon (1982), for six bass clarinets and three contrabass clarinets.

Many of Bois’s other compositions have also been written for friends and colleagues. For example, his Concerto pour Hrisanide (1968–71) was composed for the Romanian composer, improviser, and piano virtuoso Alexandru Hrisanide. It quotes from Hrisanide’s own compositions, and requires the soloist to play not only piano, but an electronic organ, a toy piano, and a large tom-tom. The 1980 Sonata for violin and piano is also dedicated to Hrisanide, along with the Hungarian violinist György Hamza (who is also the dedicatee of the Concerto for Two Violins and Orchestra). Bois also composed pieces for two other Romanian musicians: the clarinetist Sonia Dumitrescu, for whom he composed Une danse pour Sonia (1973), and the viola player Vladimir Mendelssohn, for whom he wrote the Sonata for solo viola (1981) and Vladimir's Hyde-Away for viola and piano. In 1991, a group of Bois’s Romanian friends arranged a concert in Bucharest in his honour.

Allegro (1987) and Gaberbocchus (1996) - the latter named after the Gaberbocchus Press of Stefan Themerson, with each movement given the title of one of his novels - both for the unusual combination of four pianos, were composed for Maarten Bon's Amsterdam Piano Quartet, founded in 1983. Many years earlier, Bon and Bois had both studied piano with Hans Sachs at the same time. Four years later, Bon revised Bois’s 1992 Song without Words no. 4.

Although he never composed an opera, Bois’s output includes two extended music-theatre works: the ballet Midas (1970), and Vandaag is het morgen van gisteren: (helaas geen sprookje) (1975), an hour-long extravaganza for soloists, children’s choir, orchestra and brass band. Bois's other larger-scale works include a Chamber Symphony for 13 winds, a Violin Concerto, a Concerto for Two Violins, and two Piano Concertos. The greatest part of his compositional output, however, consists of chamber music for a wide variety of ensembles, including four string quartets, two wind quintets, and a concerted work for solo double bass with double wind quintet. The two wind quintets (Chants en contrepoints from 1962 and Réflexions sur le jour où Pérotin le Grand ressuscitera from 1969) were both writ -ten for the Danzi Quintet, and Bois also wrote solo pieces for some of the members of this well-known ensemble: flutist Frans Vester (Muziek for solo flute, 1961), oboist Koen van Slogteren (Beams, for oboe and piano, 1979), and clarinetist Piet Honingh (Vertiges, 1987).

Bois has shown a special interest in composing for the recorder, an instrument with which he became acquainted initially from the Dutch virtuoso Frans Brüggen, for whom he wrote his first recorder piece, Muziek voor altblokfluit, in 1961. Muziek is clearly influenced by Berio’s flute Sequenza (1958), but also by the supple lyricism found in Boulez's Le marteau sans maître. This piece, based on successive transformations of a twelve-tone row, requires a level of skill that was unprecedented at the time: it employs the full chromatic range of the instrument, featuring extremes of range, rapid, difficult fingerings in complex rhythms, large dynamic changes and a modest range of extended techniques: fluttertonguing, glissando, and finger vibrato. Initially received even by professional players with dismay over its "unjustifiably" tricky rhythms, as well as its "unintelligible" formal design, Muziek has come to be regarded as one of the best avant-garde works of the 1960s for the instrument, and is considered a central work in the recorder’s 20th-century repertoire, whose technical extravagances have become "a necessary part of the training of every conservatory student".

When the German recorder player Michael Vetter came to Holland looking for composers to write new works for him, he introduced du Bois and his colleagues Louis Andriessen and Will Eisma to many new techniques, which du Bois explored in Spiel und Zwischenspiel for recorder and piano (1962), a work quite unlike anything previously written for recorder, which employs very high notes, harmonics, multiphonics, white noise, glissandos, and what Vetter calls "differentiated vibration techniques".

Between 1960 and 1969 Bois composed a series of seven Pastorales for various instrumental combinations. (Pastorale V, for example, is his Second String Quartet, written in 1966). The numerical order does not correspond to the order of composition. Rather, the pieces are arranged so as to become increasingly remote from the character suggested by the series title. He planned the cycle to amount to nine or ten pieces in all, to conclude with a large-dimension composition combining all of the instruments used in the preceding works in the series. By far his best-known and often-recorded work is the last work in this series, Pastorale VII (1964) for solo recorder, which employs aleatory techniques and is based on a motivic distribution and filtering of several dense chords. It was Pastorale VII that convinced Louis Andriessen to authorise a recorder version of his Paintings for flute and piano, since he felt the recorder had more potential than the flute for producing new and exciting sounds. Pastorale II (begun in 1963 but completed only in 1969) also includes the alto recorder, together with flute and guitar.

More recently, Bois composed two pieces for the Dutch recorder virtuoso Baldrick Deerenberg: Adagio cantabile, for tenor recorder and piano (1979), and Spellbound (1976), which bears the extraordinary subtitle: On Baldrick's 110-inch Contrabass Recorder with Extension, or: How Dorinde Got a New-born Brother.

=== Compositional technique and style ===
In general, Bois's music includes a penchant for musical comedy and explores the humorous possibilities of avant-garde materials. His earliest compositional style (from his earliest compositions up to the Sonatine for piano of 1960) showed the influence of Willem Pijper, but was also close to the younger generation of French composers. At this time he employed serial technique under the stylistic influence of Anton Webern as well as, amongst others, Pierre Boulez, Karlheinz Stockhausen, Luigi Nono, and Luciano Berio. Representative works of this period include the First String Quartet (1960), Bewegingen, for piccolo and piano (1961), and Spiel en Zwischenspiel (1962).

Tentatively in part III of Muziek voor fluit solo (1961), but especially by the time of Espaces à remplir (1963), the Deuxième série de rondeaux (1964), and Ad libitum (1965), Bois had begun including sections with degrees of improvisation. In these works, du Bois would fix the registers of certain pitch-complexes to create groups that dominate one or more parts, or even the entire ensemble for sections of the score. Sometimes these are twelve-tone complexes and sometimes smaller sets (what Josef Matthias Hauer called “tropes”). These groups serve as the focus of passages that may either be written out in all details, or partly improvised. Bois expertly fashions such sections, either as monolithic blocks or, by contrast, in a counterpointing of different groups. Even in a fully notated score such as Muziek voor altblokfluit (1961), when working within these fixed pitch complexes du Bois said he had the feeling of improvising "like a jazz piano player" (quoted in§. Stage layout also became an important part of the score in ensemble pieces such as Espaces a remplir.

His treatment of rhythm became increasingly free over the course of the 1960s. Earlier on, temporal order is maintained, if only in a general way. His early Three Pieces for Clarinet (1958), for example, present metronomically specified, but flexible and varied rhythmic structures without bar lines, which nevertheless are carefully measured rhythmically. However, by the mid-sixties—for example in Pour faire chanter la polonaise (1965)—rhythmic control is almost completely abandoned so far as notation is concerned, while pitch and dynamics continue to be exactly prescribed.

By the early seventies, Bois had begun to incorporate quotations from earlier music, as in the Concerto pour Hrisanide (1971), or just generally familiar material, such as suddenly breaking into "traditional" melody-and-accompaniment figurations in Fusion pour deux (1971) and New Pieces for piano (1972). One of the earliest and most extreme examples is the orchestral music for the ballet Midas (1970), which contains quotations from the works of Johann Strauss, Jr., Gustav Mahler, Antonio Vivaldi, and John Blow. This return to familiar material was seen on the one hand as the emergence of "a more individual style". displaying "a rare talent for musical comedy as well as a habit of boldly exploring the possibilities of avant-garde matter in a joyful manner". On the other hand, particularly by American critics reviewing printed scores rather than performances, this was regarded as a "haphazard and sketchy" carelessness of vertical or linear movement, resulting in textures "perforated by absentminded silences"—an arbitrary and unjustified usage of clichés from the "catalog of newly-invented and already-used-up effects" in vogue at that time, as well as an indifference toward sonority, intensified by a "gaucheness of the 'traditional' passages".

Although different stylistic fields often overlap in Dutch music of the 1970s and 1980s, Bois did not adopt the minimalism that became fashionable at that time in the Netherlands. His music from around 1985 is associated with that of composers such as Konrad Boehmer, Walter Hekster, Ton de Kruyf, and Jan Vriend, who are described as "post-serial" in style.

=== Prizes and distinctions ===
Bois received the ANV Visser Neerlandiaprijs twice: in 1966 for his work Pour deux violons and in 1964 for his Muziek voor Altblokfluit.

== Jurist ==
In the law, Bois has specialised in author/musician rights and copyright law, and was legal counsel to (and head of the legal department of) the Dutch musicians-rights organisation BUMA (Bureau voor MuziekAuteursrecht).

Bois was consulted by the Dutch Society of Composers in April 1974 in a widely publicized case in which the composer Hans Kox declared himself a victim of "cultural murder" after a number of music critics had unanimously savaged Kox’s opera Dorian Gray, and a group of colleagues led by Tera de Marez Oyens called on the Society to take legal action against a “conspiracy” of "shameful criticism".

In addition to his work within the Netherlands, Bois has published internationally on these subjects, and later became recognised as an authority in the area of copyright issues involved with sound sampling. After his retirement from BUMA in 1994 he continued to appear at public forums in the Netherlands as an expert in copyright law and music .

Bois died in Haarlem on 28 August 2013.

== Writings ==
=== Music ===
- 1968. "Zevenentwintig informaties over de vorm." Raster 2, no. 1 (April), 95–109.
- 1976. "And There Were Others Too (Composers in the Netherlands between the End of the First World War and 1930)". Key Notes, no. 3:46–53.
- 1983. "Dead Pigeons Are Falling around Me". Key Notes, no. 18:20–22.
- 1996. "Brieven". Mens en Melodie 51 (October): 464–65.

=== Law ===
- 1978. The Author, His Work and His Copyrights Society: General Report for the Congress of the ALAI in Paris, May 29–June 3, 1978. Amsterdam: [n.p.].
- 1988. (with J. van Santbrink and H. Spoorj) "Stijlnabootsing van Muziekwerken". Report commissioned by BUMA.
- 1991. L'histoire de l'ALAI depuis la deuxième guerre mondiale, exprimée en resolutions, commentaires et vœux. Paris: Association Littéraire et Artistique Internationale.
- 1992. "Les aspects juridiques du sound sampling". Bulletin du droit d’auteur (UNESCO) 26, no. 2:3–7. ISSN 0304-2928. [English version, “The Legal Aspects of Sound Sampling”, Copyright Bulletin (UNESCO) 26, no. 2:3–6; Spanish version, “Los aspectos jurídicos del muestreo de sonidos (sound sampling)”, Boletín de Derecho de Autor (UNESCO) 26, no. 2:3-7.]

== Discography ==
=== Performer ===
- 1971: Grusse aus Berchtesgaden: ICP (Instant Composers Pool), 1968–1970. Instant Composers Pool ICP 007/008 (2 LPs). On disc 1, Bois plays glockenspiel and organ on track 1 and piano on track 3 ("Grüsse aus Berchtesgaden" and "François le Marin", both for the play Toller, recorded 28 October 1969); piano on track 5 ("Introduction and First Entrance of the Horsemen" for the play De ruiters, recorded 28 August 1968), and organ on track 6 ("Song of the Lusitanian Bully II" for the play Gezang van de Lusitaanse bullebak, recorded 26 March 1969). On disc 2, Bois plays piano and organ on tracks 1 ("Lass mich nicht weinen IV", recorded 22 November 1969) & 6 ("Tussen de dijen van'n mokkel", recorded 8 January 1970), piano on tracks 2 ("Touches" for the play Toller, recorded 27 October 1969), 3 ("Fascinating Appie" for the play Oog om oog, tand om tand, recorded 7 February 1970) & 7 ("Five Songs from The Lusitanian Bully", for the play Gezang van de Lusitaanse bullebak, recorded 26 March 1969)
- 2001. Willem Breuker, "The Pirate": Previously Unreleased Recordings 1969–1994. BVhaast 0301 (1 CD). Amsterdam: BVHaast. [Bois plays organ on track 1, (Overture to the play Oog om oog, tand om tand, recorded 13 February 1970), piano and synthesizer on tracks 2, 3, 6, 9 (from the incidental music for Koninkrijk, recorded March 1977), and piano and organ on track 15 (Overture to De Spaanse hoer, recorded 21 December 1969)]

=== Compositions ===
- 1966. Opus 66: Highlights in Dutch Avant-Garde Music. Radio Nederland 109582 Y. LP recording: 1 sound disc, analog, 33⅓ rpm, stereo, 12 in. Hilversum: Radio Nederland. Bois: Quartet, for oboe, violin, viola, violoncello (Netherlands Oboe Quartet: Victor Swillens, oboe; Jan Wittenberg, violin; Adriaan van 't Wout, viola; Max Werner, cello), with music by Kruyf, Straesser, and Eisma.
- 1972. Canti carnascialeschi. Donemus Audio-Visual Series, 1971–72: no. 4. Donemus DAVS 7172/4. LP recording: 1 sound disc, analog, 33⅓ rpm, stereo.12 in. Amsterdam: Donemus, DAVS 7172/4. Bois: Summer Music, with music by Heppener, Bruins, Borgart, Eisma, Werner, Hupperts, Voorberg, and Vlijmen
- 1973. Opus 72. Radio Nederland 6808 107. LP recording: 1 sound disc, analog, 33⅓ rpm, stereo.; 12 in. Hilversum, Netherlands: Radio Nederland. Bois: Concerto pour Hrisanide (Alexander Hrisanide, piano, electronic organ, toy piano and tom tom; Hilversum Radio Chamber Orchestra; Roelof Krol, conductor); and works by Ton de Leeuw and Tristan Keuris.
- 1973. Il flauto dolce e acerbo. Michael Vetter, recorder. Corona SM30020. LP recording. Reissued 1974, Moeck E.M. 10 003. LP recording. [Ludwigsburg]: Moeck. Reissued 1999 as Il flauto dolce e acerbo: Neue Musik für Blockflöte, Vol. 2. Cadenza CAD 800 850. CD recording. Rob du Bois: Pastorale VII, and music by Jürg Baur, Klaus Hashagen, Dieter Schönbach, and Michael Vetter.
- 1975 Hans-Martin Linde spielt alte und neue Blockflötenmusik. Hans-Martin Linde, recorder; Konrad Ragossnig, guitar & lute. EMI Electrola 1 C 065-28 841. LP recording: 1 sound disc, analog, 33⅓ rpm, stereo., 12 in. Cologne: EMI Electrola. Rob du Bois: Pastorale VII, and works by Anonymous, Telemann, Bassano, Bossinensis, and Linde.
- 1975. Music from the 1975 Holland Festival. Benita Valente; Norma Procter; René Jacobs; Alexander Oliver, tenor.; Michael Rippon; Lyne Dourian; Bernard Kruysen; Anne Fournet; Nikolaus Harnoncourt; Jean Fournet; Willem Frederik Bon. Radio Nederland 6808 401—6808 402 LP recording: 2 sound discs, analog, 33⅓ rpm, stereo, 12 in. Hilversum: Radio Nederland. Bois: Allegro, for strings, and music by Handel, Milhaud, Nico Schuyt, and Willem de Fesch.
- 1979. Nederlandse muziek. EMI His Master's Voice: 1A 051-26331. LP recording 1 sound disc: analog, 33⅓ rpm, stereo, 12 in. Bois: Skarabee, and music by Heppener, Jurriaan Andriessen, Orthel, Frid, Breuker, Delden, Manneke, Flothuis, and Porcelijn.
- 1985. Ein Meister der Blockflöte. Sebastian Kelber, recorder; Elza van der Ven-Ulsamer, harpsichord; Josef Ulsamer, viola da gamba; Gyula Rácz, percussion. Colosseum COL 0643. LP recording: 1 sound disc, analog, stereo, 33⅓ rpm,12 in. Nuremberg: Colosseum Music Entertainment GmbH. Rob du Bois: Pastorale VII, and works by Vivaldi, J. C. Bach, Telemann, Erhard Karkoschka, Berio, and Werner Heider.
- 1993. Kasseler Avantgarde-Reihe I. Claudia Hillenbach, recorder; Mieroprint EM 6002 (1 CD). Münster: Mieroprint Musikverlag und Versandhandel. Bois: Muziek voor altblokfluit, and compositions by Hirose, Shinohara, Casken, Masuch, Rühling, and Michel.
- 2008. Peschel, Dorit. Neue Blockflötenmusik des 20. Jahrhuderts. Audiotransit ATCD2-004 (1 CD). (Includes Pastoral VII by Rob du Bois, with works by Heider, Berio, Shinohara, Karkoschka, Riehm, Ishii, Braun, Spahn, Rühling, Martini, and Bieler.) [Germany]: C + P Audiotransit.
- 2009. Music in Motion. Abbie de Quant (flute), Elizabeth van Malde (piano). Fineline Classical FL 72413. (Rob Du Bois: Bewegingen, with works by Prokofiev, Rachmaninov, Otar Taktakishvili, Robert Zuidam, and Sofia Gubaidulina)

== Compositions ==
=== Stage ===
- Midas, ballet music, for orchestra (1970)
- Vandaag is het morgen van gisteren: (helaas geen sprookje) [Today Is the Tomorrow of Yesterday: (Alas, Not a Fairytale)], for speaking voice, soprano, SA children’s choir, orchestra, and brass band (text by Rob du Bois and Willem Jan Wegerif) (1975)

=== Orchestra/band ===
- Allegro, for string orchestra (1973)
- A Flower Given to My Daughter, for orchestra (1970)
- My Daughter's Flower, for brass band (1982)
- Simultaneous, for orchestra (1965)
- Skarabee, for orchestra (1977)
- Suite no. 1, for orchestra (1973)
- Tre pezzi, for orchestra (1973)

=== Concertante ===
- Breuker Concerto, for four saxophones, two clarinets, and 21 strings (1967)
- Cercle, for piano, nine wind instruments, and percussion (1963)
- Concertino, for school orchestra (1963)
- Concerto for piano and orchestra (1960; rev. 1968)
- Concerto for violin and orchestra (1975)
- Concerto for two violins and orchestra (1979)
- Le Concerto pour Hrisanide, for piano and orchestra (1968–71)
- Heliotrope, for a solo instrument and an optional number of accompanists (1967)
- Vertiges, for contrabass and two wind quintets (1987)

=== Chamber orchestra/large ensemble ===
- Espaces à remplir, for eleven musicians (1963)
- Fleeting, for clarinet choir (1997)
- Sinfonia da camera, for two flutes, two oboes, two clarinets, two bassoons, contrabassoon and four horns (1980)
- Springtime, for 11 musicians: piccolo, soprano-, tenor- and alto saxophone, horn, two trumpets, two trombones, tuba, and piano (1978)

=== Chamber music ===
- Ad libitum, for violin and piano (1965)
- Adagio cantabile, for tenor recorder and piano (1979)
- Allegro, for four pianos (1978)
- Amalgamated Music for Four Sliding Trombones (1978)
- Ars aequi, for piano and two contrabasses (1984)
- Autumn leaves, for guitar and harpsichord (1984)
- Axioma, for two pianos, each four-hands (1982)
- Bagatellen (7), for flute and piano (1971)
- Basso doble, for contrabass and piano (1973)
- Beams, for oboe and piano (1979)
- Beat music, for two percussionists (1967)
- Bewegingen [Movements], for piccolo and piano (1961; later rev. flute and piano)
- Because It Is, for four clarinets (1973)
- The Caretaker: Three Impressions after Harold Pinter, for alto saxophone and marimba (1986)
- Chansons voor appâter les chéiroptères, for oboe, 2 oboes d'amore, and 2 English horns (1975)
- Chants en contrepoints, for wind quintet (1962)
- A Combination of Voices, for two pianos (1968)
- Danses tristes (3), for horn in F and viola (1954)
- The Dog Named Boo Has a Master Called Lobo, for clarinet, violin, and piano (1972)
- The Eighteenth of June, for four saxophones (1974)
- Elegia, for oboe d'amore, violin, viola, and cello (1980, arr. oboe d'amore and string orchestra 1995)
- Enigma, for flute, bass clarinet, percussion, and piano (1969)
- Forever Amber, for two guitars (1985)
- Fünf, for oboe, clarinet, and bassoon (1996)
- Fusion voor deux, for bass clarinet and piano (1971)
- Gaberbocchus, for four pianos (1996)
- Die Gretchenfrage, for flute and piano (2004)
- Herman's Hide-Away, for soprano saxophone and piano (1976)
- His Flow of Spirits Is Something Wonderful: Cheerful Music, for flute, bass clarinet, and piano (1979)
- Hyperion, for clarinet, horn, viola, and piano (1984; rev. 1985)
- Iguanodon, for six bass clarinets and three contrabass clarinets (1982)
- The Independent (Fourth String Quartet) (1989–90)
- Das Liebesverbot, for four Wagner tubas (1986)
- Little Pieces (7), for violin and piano (1965) [transcribed from Seven Little Piano Pieces, date unknown]
- Luna, for alto flute and piano (1987; orchestrated 1987)
- Melody, for bass clarinet and string quartet (1974)
- Mir träumte von einem Königskind, for horn and piano (1979)
- Mood music, for oboe and organ (1965)
- Musica per quattro, for horn, two trumpets, and trombone (1967)
- Musique d'atelier, for bass clarinet, trombone, cello, and piano (1968; rev. 1973)
- My River Runs to Thee, for three guitars (1978)
- Night music, for flute, viola, and guitar (1967)
- Odes (2), for violin and piano (1975) (contribution to Een suite voor De Suite, ten compositions for piano (two- and four-handed), two pianos, and violin and piano, by ten composers)
- Pastorale I, for oboe, clarinet, and harp (1960; rev. 1969)
- Pastorale II, for recorder, flute, and guitar (1963–69)
- Pastorale III, for E-flat clarinet, bongos, and contrabass (1963)
- Pastorale V, for string quartet (String Quartet No. 2) (1966)
- Per due, for flute and harp (1968)
- Polonaise, for a pianist and a percussionist (1971)
- Pour deux violons, for two violins (1966)
- Quartet no. 1, for strings (1960)
- Quartet no. 2, for strings [see: Pastorale V] (1966)
- Quartet no. 3, for strings (1981)
- Quartet no. 4, for strings [see: The Independent] (1990)
- Quartet, for oboe, violin, violin, and cello (1960; rev. 1964)
- Réflexions sur le jour où Pérotin le Grand ressuscitera, for wind quintet (1969)
- Rondeaux pour deux, for piano four-hands, optional percussion and optional speaking voice (text by R. du Bois and L. Langeveld) (1962).
- Rondeaux (Deuxième série), for piano four-hands and optional percussion (1964)
- Rounds, for clarinet and piano (1967)
- Sad Dances (three), for two violas (1954)
- Sonata for cello and piano (1982)
- Sonata for violin and piano (1980)
- Songs, for violin, cello, and piano (1998)
- Spiel en Zwischenspiel, for alto recorder and piano (1962)
- Stukken (2) (Two Pieces), for flute, oboe, and cello (1962)
- Summer Music, for alto saxophone, violin, and cello (1967)
- Symphorine, for flute and string trio (1987)
- Symposion, for oboe, violin, viola, and cello (1969)
- Thalatta, Thalatta, for four bass flutes (1987)
- Tracery, for bass clarinet and four percussionists (1979)
- Trio for flute, oboe, and clarinet (1961)
- Trio, for violin, viola, and cello (1967)
- Trio agitato, for horn, trombone, and tuba (1969)
- Ut supra, for viola and piano (1973)
- Vladimir's Hyde Away, for viola and piano
- Zodiak, for one or more instruments or instrumental groups (1977)

=== Solo instrumental ===
==== Keyboard ====
- The Andino Sonata, for piano (1988)
- Archipels for harpsichord (1974)
- Cadences, for piano (1975)
- Études (3), for piano (1967)
- Four Indulgent Pieces, for piano (1988)
- Just Like a Little Sonata, for piano (1964)
- Kleine Klavierstücke (7) (1953; rev. 1968) [also arr. violin and piano (see: Chamber music)]
- New Pieces, for piano (1972)
- Pastorale VI, for piano (1964)
- Sonatine for piano (1960)
- Song (without words) no. 4, for piano solo (1992; rev. 2000 by Maarten Bon)
- Voices, for piano (1966)

==== Other instruments ====
- Chemin, for bass clarinet solo (1971)
- Une Danse pour Sonia, for clarinet solo (1973)
- Jeu, for oboe (1969)
- Mercy for John Vincent Moon, for piano (1976)
- Music for Solo Flute (1961)
- Music for Alto Recorder (1961)
- Music for a Sliding Trombone (1968)
- On a Lion's Interlude, for alto flute (1986)
- Pastorale IV, for guitar (1963)
- Pastorale VII, for alto recorder (1964)
- Pieces (3), for clarinet (1958)
- Quatre invocations, for bassoon solo (1976)
- Ranta music, for a percussionist (1968; rev. 1971)
- Sketch, for cello and piano (1968)
- Sonata for solo viola (1981)
- Sonata no. 1, for solo violin (1955)
- Sonata no. 2, for solo violin (1992)
- Souvenir, for violin (Soir pour violon) (1969)
- Spellbound: on Baldrick's 110-inch Contrabass Recorder with Extension, or: How Dorinde Got a New-born Brother, for contrabass recorder (1976)

=== Vocal ===
- Because Going Nowhere Takes a Long Time, for medium voice, flute and piano (text by Kenneth Patchen) (1967); version for soprano, clarinet, and piano (1969)
- Diotima, for a singer, clarinet, viola, and piano, on a text by Friedrich Hölderlin (1984; rev. 1985)
- Drei traurige Tänze, for alto voice and viola (texts by Stefan George’s Das Jahr der Seele) (1954)
- Une façon de dire que les hommes de cent vingt ans ne chantent plus, for soprano, piano, and 4 percussion instruments (1963)
- Inferno, for soprano, 2 violins, cello, and harpsichord (text by Dante Alighieri) (1974)
- Lieder (20), for voice and piano (1951–71)
- Pour faire chanter la polonaise for flute, soprano, and 3 pianos (1965)
- Eine Rede, for soprano, clarinet, basset horn, and bass clarinet (text by Walther von der Vogelweide) (1974)
- Songs of Innocence: countertenor, tenor recorder, and contrabass, on a text by Willem Jan Wegerif (1974)
- Les Voyages de Gulliver: four fragments, for mezzo-soprano and piano (1967)
- Words, for mezzo-soprano, flute, cello, and piano (1966)
