= Wind Quintet (Schoenberg) =

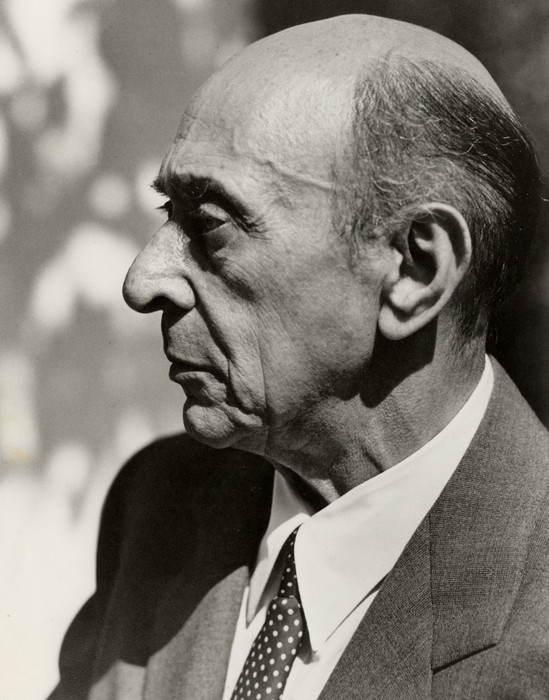
Arnold Schoenberg, composer of the Wind Quintet

The Wind Quintet, Op. 26, is a chamber music composition by Arnold Schoenberg, composed in 1923–24. It is one of the earliest of Schoenberg's compositions to use twelve-tone technique.

== History ==
Schoenberg's wind quintet was one of his first twelve-tone compositions. It was composed in 1923–24, and individual sketches in the composer's sketchbook number 5 contain precise data on the progress of the composition. The world premiere took place on Schoenberg's fiftieth birthday, 13 September 1924. The score's dedication is "Dem Bubi Arnold" (To little Arnold), the composer's grandson, his daughter Gertrud and Felix Greissle's child.

== Analysis ==
The Quintet is in four movements:

1. Schwungvoll [Lively]
2. Anmutig und heiter—scherzando [Graceful and cheerful—scherzando]
3. Etwas langsam [Somewhat slowly]
4. Rondo

The work is laid out in the four-movement pattern of Classical chamber-music forms, using the thematic contrast usual in them. In this way, Schoenberg sought to restore the innate expressive qualities of the forms of tonal music, and so the Quintet, along with the Suite for piano, Op. 25, the Suite for septet, Op. 29, the Third String Quartet, Op. 30, and the Variations for Orchestra, represent the most extreme point of his neoclassicism.

The first movement follows standard sonata-allegro layout, and "is perhaps the most notorious example of a twelve-tone movement imitating a tonal form", with a repeated two-theme exposition, a development section, and a recapitulation in which the second theme is transposed up a perfect fourth, as if it were a tonal work with the second key area originally in the dominant. The mistaken impression is easily formed that this is "some sort of musical taxidermy—rondo and sonata-allegro skins stuffed and mounted with chromatic sawdust" but, despite superficial appearances, the structure is quite a different thing. The opening theme of the first movement, for example, is in two phrases. The first, antecedent phrase uses the first hexachord of the basic series; the second, consequent phrase uses the second hexachord.

The opening melody of the scherzo movement starts with the fourth note of the basic series, the first three notes having already appeared in the accompaniment. Unlike some other passages in the Quintet, the accompaniment here uses the same tones as are found in the melody but not at the same time. Later in the same movement, different forms of the row are combined in contrapuntal elaboration (e.g., the inversion and retrograde inversion in b. 88–94)—a procedure also featured later in the Rondo.

The third, slow movement is in an extended ternary form, with coda. A substantial transition section in bars 53–81, with a change of meter and faster tempo, connects the central section to the return of the opening material.

The finale follows the expected pattern for a Classical seven-part rondo, with motivically distinguished sections in a design that may be designated as A–B–A′–C–A″–B′–A–coda. These sections are also distinguished by the row forms used on the surface.

== Discography ==
In chronological order of recording:

- Arnold Schoenberg: Wind Quintet. Metropolitan Wind Quintet LP recording. Dial 13. New York: Dial Records, 1951.
- Arnold Schoenberg: Quintet for Wind Instruments, Op. 26. Philadelphia Woodwind Quintet (William Kincaid, flute; John de Lancie, oboe; Anthony Gigliotti, clarinet; Sol Schoenbach, bassoon; Mason Jones, horn). LP recording 1 sound disc: 33 1/3 rpm, monaural, 12 inch. Columbia Masterworks ML 5217. [New York]: Columbia, 1957.
- Arnold Schoenberg: Wind Quintet, Op. 26. Czech Philharmonic Wind Quintet. Recorded in the Supraphon studios in Prague. LP recording 1 sound disc: 33 1/3 rpm, stereo, 12 inch. Supraphon 50 692. Prague: Supraphon, 1966.
- Arnold Schoenberg: Wind Quintet, Op. 26. Danzi Quintet. LP recording. Philips PHC 9068. [Holland]: Philips, 1967. Reissued on HNH Records, LP [number unknown], 1978. Reissued together with Harrison Birtwistle: Refrains and Choruses for Wind Quintet. Philips Modern Music Series. LP recording 1 sound disc: analog, 33 1/3 rpm, stereo, 12 inch. Philips 802 740 LY. [Holland]: Philips, 1960s?.
- Arnold Schoenberg: Quintet for Wind Instruments, Op. 26. New England Conservatory Chamber Players, John Heiss, conductor. New England Conservatory Series, vol. 2. LP recording. 2 sides, 12 inch, 33 1/3 rpm, stereophonic. Golden Crest Records NEC-102. [N.p.]: Golden Crest Records, 1969.
- Arnold Schoenberg: Suite, Op. 29; Wind Quintet, Op. 26. Members of the London Sinfonietta (Op. 26: Sebastian Bell, flute; Janet Craxton, oboe; Antony Pay, clarinet; Alan Civil, horn; Roger Birnstingl, bassoon); David Atherton, conductor. Recorded at All Saints Church, Petersham, 1973–1974. Compact disc 1 sound disc: digital, stereo, 4¾ inch. London 433 083-2. New York: London Records, 1992.
- Arnold Schoenberg: Wind Quintet, Op. 26. Wiener Bläsersolisten. LP recording 1 sound disc: 33 1/3 rpm, stereo, 12 inch. Deutsche Grammophon 2530 825. [Hamburg]: Deutsche Grammophon, 1977.
- Art of Basel Ensemble. Johann Sebastian Bach: Musikalisches Opfer, Ricercare à 6.; Arnold Schoenberg: Quintet for Winds, Op. 26; Leoš Janáček: Mládí. Basel Ensemble. Recorded 26–27 January 1986, Studio 1, Bayerischer Rundfunk, Munich. Compact disc 1 sound disc: digital, stereo, 4¾ inch. Denon CM-1474. [Japan]: Denon; U.S.A.: A & M Records, 1987.
- Aulos-Bläserquintett. Vol. 7. Paul Hindemith: Kleine Kammermusik, Pp. 24/2; Hanns Eisler: Divertimento, Op. 5 [recte: Op. 4]; Arnold Schoenberg: Bläserquintett, Op. 26. Aulos-Bläserquintett./ Recorded 1992, SDR, Stuttgart. Compact disc 1 sound disc: digital, 4¾ inch. Koch Schwann 3-1163-2 H1. Austria: Koch Schwann, 1994.
- Soni Ventorum Wind Quintet Plays Smith & Schoenberg. William O. Smith: Jazz Set for Violin and Wind Quintet (1990); Arnold Schoenberg: Wind Quintet, Op. 26 (1924). Aloysia Friedmann, violin; Soni Ventorum Wind Quintet. Compact disc 1 sound disc: digital, stereo, 4¾ inch. Musical Heritage Society 514225K. Oakhurst, New Jersey: Musical Heritage Society, 1996
- Hanns Eisler: Vierzehn Arten den Regen zu beschreiben, Op. 70; Divertimento, Op. 4. Arnold Schoenberg: Quintet for Winds, Op. 26. Kammermusikvereinigung der Deutschen Staatsoper Berlin (1st work); Danzi-Bläserquintett Berlin (2nd and 3rd works). Recorded May and October 1967, Christuskirche, Berlin (1st work) and December 1987 – January 1988, Lukaskirche, Dresden (2nd and 3rd works). Compact Disc 1 sound disc: digital, 4¾ inch. Berlin Classics 0092552BC. [Berlin?]: Berlin Classics, 1997.
- Houston Symphony Chamber Players; Christoph Eschenbach, Piano: Schoenberg, Webern, Berg. Anton Webern: Concerto, Op. 24; Drei kleine Stücke, Op. 11; Vier Stücke, Op. 7; Alban Berg: Sonata for Piano, Op. 1; Arnold Schoenberg: Wind Quintet, Op. 26. Uri Pianka and Eric Halen, violins; Wayne Brooks, viola; Desmond Hoebig, cello; Aralee Dorough, flute; Robert Atherholt, oboe; David peck, clarinet; Benjamin Kamins, bassoon; William Ver Meulen, horn; John DeWitt, trumpet; Allen Barnhill, trombone. Recorded 1995, Duncan Hall, Rice University, Houston. Compact Disc 1 sound disc: digital, 4¾ inch. Koch International Classics 3-7337-2 H1. Port Washington, New York: Koch International L. P., 1996.
- Zemlinsky Quintett Wien. Arnold Schönberg: Bläserquintett Op. 26; Jean-René Françaix: Quintett Nr. 1. Heidrun Wagner-Lanzendörfer, flute; Andrea Krauk, oboe; Kurt Franz Schmid, clarinet; Michel Gasiarino, horn; Gottfried Pokorny, bassoon. Recorded at the ORF Broadcasting Studio, Vienna, between November 1997 and March 1998. Compact Disc 1 sound disc: digital, 4¾ inch. ORF CD 163. [Austria]: ORF Radio Niederösterreich, 1998.
- The Robert Craft Collection: Music of Arnold Schoenberg vol. 8. Chamber Symphony No. 2; Die glückliche Hand, Op. 18; Wind Quintet, Op. 26. Mark Beesley, bass; Simon Joly Chorale; Philharmonia Orchestra; New York Woodwind Quintet (Carol Wincenc, flute; Stephen Taylor, oboe; Charles Neidich, clarinet; William Purvis, horn; Donald MacCourt, bassoon); Robert Craft, conductor. (Quintet recorded 6–8 January 2004, American Academy of Arts and Letters, New York) Compact Disc 1 sound disc: digital; 4¾ inch. Naxos 8.557526. [Hong Kong]: Naxos, 2008. Also packaged as one disc of The Works of Arnold Schoenberg, Vol. 1. Compact Discs, 5 sound discs: digital; 4¾ inch. Naxos 8.505223. [Hong Kong]: Naxos, 2008.
- Farkas Quintet Amsterdam live recording Arnold Schoenberg: Wind Quintet, Op. 26. Herman van Kogelenberg, flute; Hans Wolters, oboe; Marcel Geraeds, clarinet; Fons Verspaandonk, horn; Remko Edelaar, bassoon. Recorded in Cenakel, Tilburg Netherlands, 2007. Quintone Recordings.
- Phoenix Ensemble: Karlheinz Stockhausen: Zeitmaße; Arnold Schoenberg: Wind Quintet, Op. 26. Phoenix Ensemble: Kelli Kathman, flute (Stockhausen); Erin Lesser, flute (Schoenberg); Carl Oswald, oboe (Stockhausen); Erin Gustafson, oboe (Schoenberg); Keve Wilson, cor anglais; Mark Lieb, clarinet; Gina Cuffari, bassoon; Alana Vegter, horn. Compact disc 1 sound disc: digital, stereo, 4¾ inch. Albany CD TROY1371. Albany, New York: Albany Records US; Kendal, Cumbria: Albany Records UK, 2012.
