= Peter Bree =

Dutch oboist and radio presenter

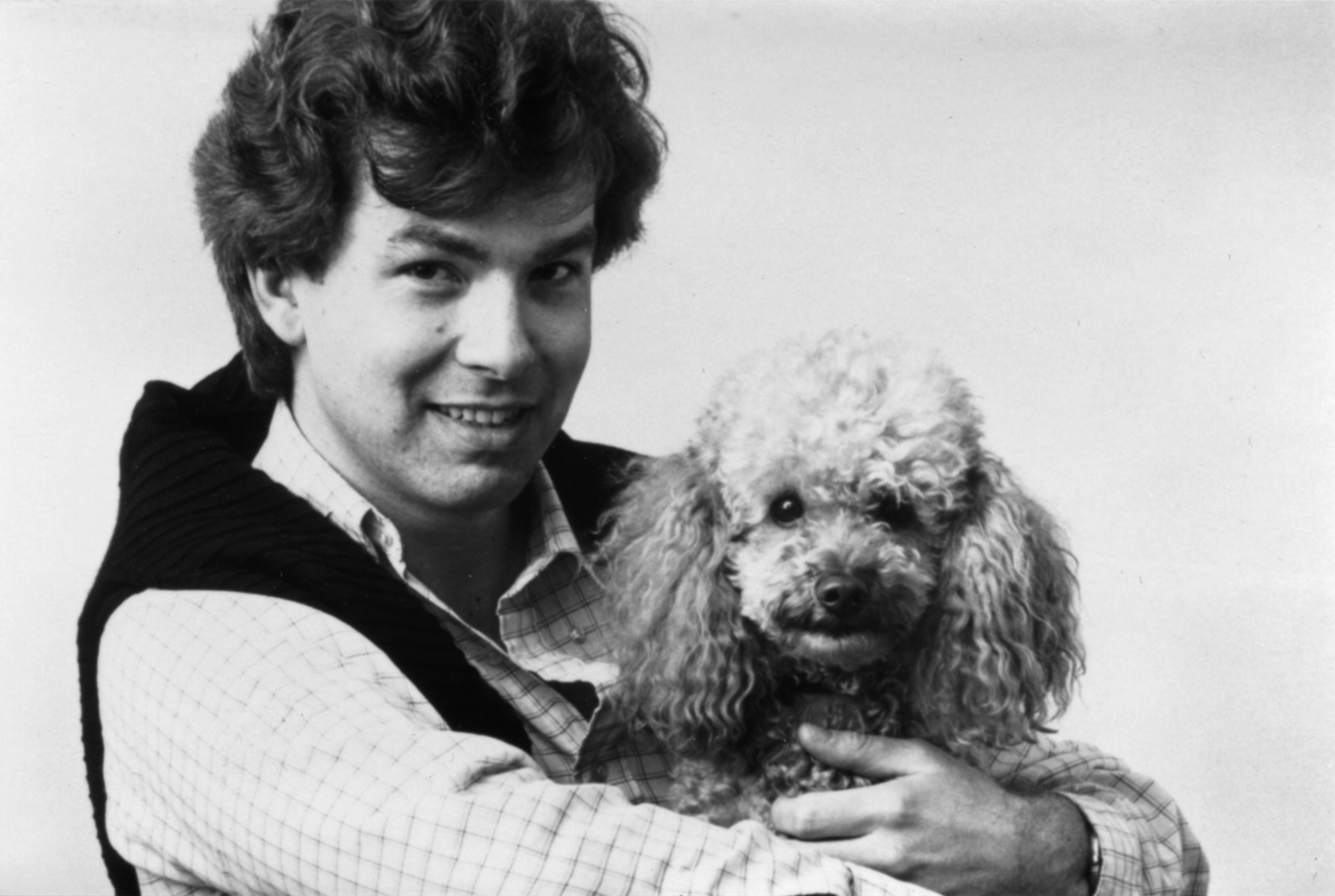
Peter and the Woof: Peter Bree and his mascot Nero ("le caniche mélomane") (1980s)

Peter Bree (born 23 September 1949) is a Dutch oboist and broadcaster. He was born in Driebergen-Rijsenburg, Netherlands.

He received his first oboe lessons from John Schreuder. He made his debut when he was 15. He studied English language and literature at the University of Groningen; as undergraduate he edited a magazine for students of English. Subsequently from 1973 he studied oboe at the Amsterdams Muzieklyceum (the present Amsterdam Conservatoire) with Han de Vries and later, with a scholarship from the Dutch Cultural Ministry, in London with Neil Black.

Peter Bree initially worked for some years as a teacher of English at secondary schools in Amsterdam, before being appointed oboist with Dutch radio (NOS), where he played in the Metropole Orkest. He later concentrated mostly on concert and chamber music, making many radio and CD recordings, always insisting on including music by a Dutch composer in his concerts: compositions dedicated to him of, among others, Edmund Rubbra, Abel Ehrlich, Jan Koetsier, Leo Samama and Ruud Bos, and the complete oboe sonatas of François Devienne that he edited and published together with Dr Bernard Rose (Magdalen College, Oxford) . UK debut: May 1976 at Pembroke College chapel, Oxford (with organist/harpsichordist Jonathan Katz, followed by recitals in Oxford (Holywell Music Room, October 1980, with Jonathan Katz, harpsichord) and London (Purcell Room, April 1979, with pianist John Alley; Wigmore Hall, November 1981, with pianist Paul Komen). He also performed in Amsterdam (Kleine Zaal, Concertgebouw) and in France (Institut Néerlandais, Paris, 1979; Festival de Palluau-sur-Indre, 1984). He performed in Belgium with the Brussels Chamber Orchestra under Maurie Bonnaerens. In 1981 he and pianist Paul Komen had the honour and privilege of being granted a private audience with Queen Elizabeth The Queen Mother at Royal Lodge, Windsor Great Park to present Her Majesty with their LP with works by Rubbra, Britten and others. Also in 1981 he received the Silver 'Vriendenkrans' award of the Friends of the Concertgebouw (Amsterdam) and the Royal Concertgebouw Orchestra. In 1988 he was awarded an Honorary Degree of Doctor of Music (DMus Hon.) from the Marquis Giuseppe Scicluna International University Foundation of Malta. He gave the first performance in the Netherlands of Grace Williams' Carillons (1980, with Dutch Radio's Promenade Orchestra under Jan Stulen) and of Michael Berkeley's Oboe Concerto (1984, with the Radio Chamber Orchestra under Richard Hickox), Both performances were recorded for Dutch radio. In 1994 he stopped playing the oboe professionally. Dr Bree suffered a stroke in mid-2017, and after the sudden and unexpected death of his best friend and companion Jur Zandbergen on Christmas Eve 2017 he more or less retired from public and musical life.

From 1980 to 1983, Peter Bree worked as a radio producer with Dutch broadcasting company AVRO, and later as radio presenter and producer with Veronica broadcasting company from 1984 to 1992, from 1994 to 1998 with Concert Radio, and from 1998 again with AVRO. In 1986/87 he was a member of the panel of adjudicators (representing the Dutch public radio companies) of the Bratislava International Music Festival. From 1984 till the end of 2010 he could be heard as presenter of classical music programmes and concert broadcasts on the Dutch classical music channel Radio 4. In 2003 he presented The Last Night of the Proms for Dutch radio live from the Royal Albert Hall in London. Much to his chagrin Dutch public broadcasters did not renew contracts with their radio presenters who were older than 60. In 2011 he compiled a CD box to mark the 70th birthday of Han de Vries, entitled "Han de Vries – The Radio Recordings" (Oboe Classics CC 2024). This was followed in 2017 by a second CD box to mark Han de Vries's 75th birthday, with the title "Han de Vries – The almost last recordings" (Attacca Productions ATT 2016.148).

In 1980, he founded together with Yehudi Menuhin (Lord Menuhin of Stoke d'Abernon) the Live Music Now foundation in the Netherlands, of which he was vice president until he stepped down in 1985. From 1987 until its dissolution in 2022 he was chairman of The Academy of the Begijnhof, Amsterdam. He was a contributor (articles/interviews/reviews) to the Dutch CD magazine Disk in 1991/92, a member of the adjudicating panel of the classical Edison Award in 1996 and 1997, and a member of the advisory committee of the Thuiskopie Fonds in 1999 and 2000. He was also a member of the Comité d'Honneur de l'Association Internationale de Musique (France) and on the board of the foundation that organized the Double Reed Festival 1995 in Rotterdam (under the auspices of the International Double Reed Society). From 2001 till 2009 he was a member of the board and chairman of the programme committee of the Netherlands Bach Society (Nederlandse Bachvereniging). On his initiative a new bridge in the Amsterdam Zuidas quarter (designed by architect Liesbeth van der Pol) was named after the composer Lex van Delden; the Lex van Deldenbrug was officially opened on 15 October 2013.

== Recordings ==
– with conservatoire chamber orchestra and flautist Leo Samama (Fasch Oboe & Flute Concerto), 1975 (D&S 6810.765)
– with soprano Christine Harvey (Bach), 1975 (Mirasound SGLP 6121)
– with Chr. Gem. Zangvereniging Jubilate Deo, Woudenberg (Handel, Mendelssohn), 1978 (STH Records MC 8227; re-issued on CD as SNT-CD 8158)
– with Telemann Ensemble (Telemann), 1981 (CRCI 180542; re-issued on CD by Etcetera Records KTC 1083)
– with organist Jaap Zwart Jr (Marais, Rheinberger, Handel, Koetsier, Pierné), 1981 (CRCI 180541)
– with pianist Jan Slothouwer (Louis Andriessen), 1981 (Phonogram/BFO 6814.482)
– with pianist Paul Komen (Rubbra, Britten, Grabert, Röntgen), 1981 (CRCI 180550; re-issued on CD by Etcetera Records KTC 1074)
– with pianist Paul Komen (Andriessen, Jacob, Britten, Koetsier, Grovlez, Bos), 1982 (CRCI 180620) – with Wegenbouwkapel Nederland (Ted Huggens' Treble Concerto), 1983 (Mirasound 20.5080; re-issued on CD by Eurosound ES 46.950 CD)
– with Roderick Shaw, fortepiano (Devienne Sonates), 1990/91 (co production Bayerische Rundfunk / Etcetera Records) (Etcetera Records KTC 1084 / KTC 1106, re-issued together as KTC 2506)
