= Bart Schneemann =

Dutch oboist, conductor, teacher and artistic director

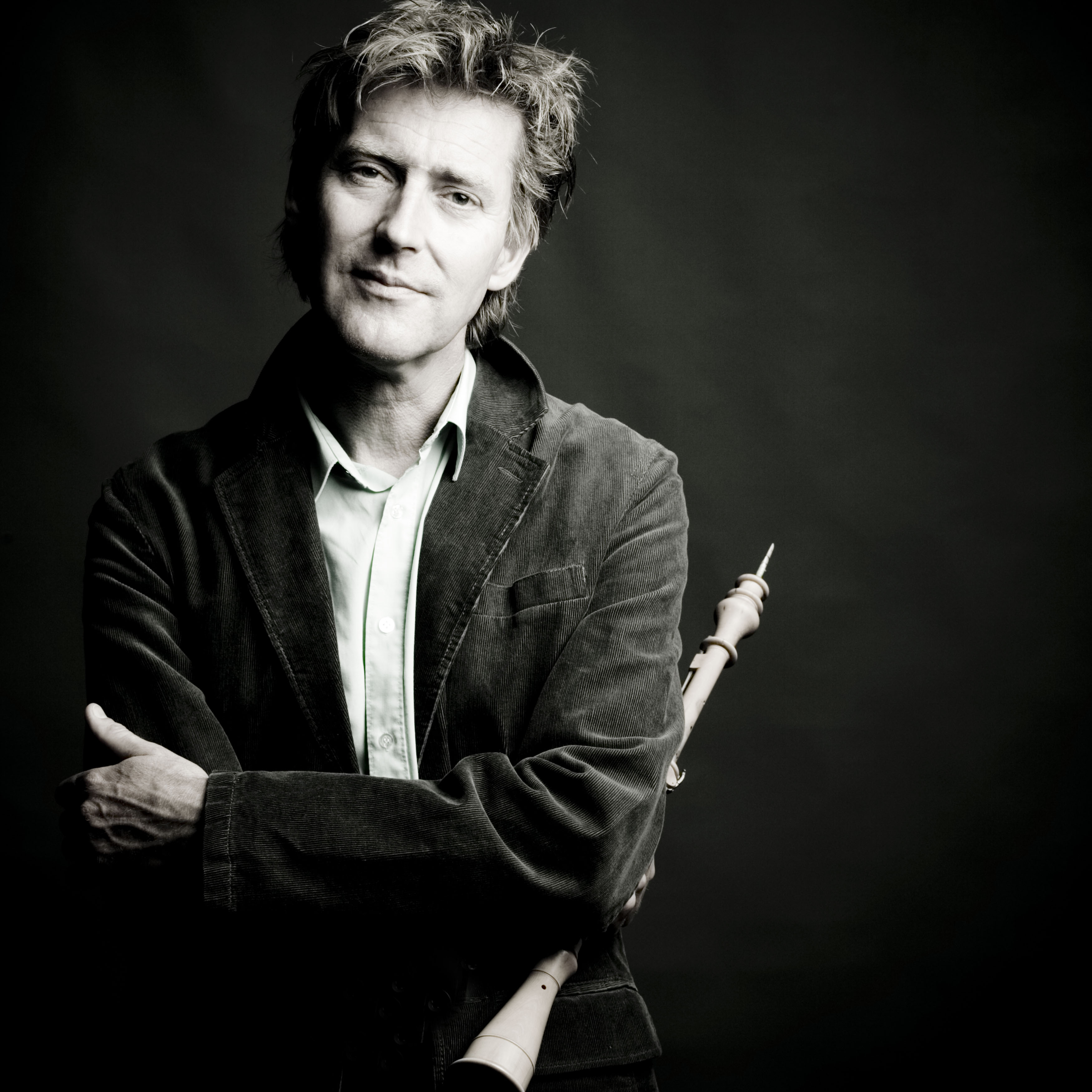
Bart Schneemann

Bart Schneemann (born 1954, in Melbourne) is a Dutch oboist, conductor, teacher and artistic director for the Netherlands Wind Ensemble. In 1977 he graduated from the Conservatory in Amsterdam. From 1976 to 1996, he was the first chair oboist in the Radio Filharmonisch Orkest and the Rotterdam Philharmonic Orchestra. He retired from playing in the orchestra to put all his time towards his solo career and his activities in the Netherlands Wind Ensemble. Schneemann plays a wide repertoire in various formations, ranging from older music (on modern oboe and classical/baroque oboe) to contemporary music. Many composers have written music especially for him, including Tristan Keuris, Wolfgang Rihm, John Zorn, Gia Kantsjeli, Kevin Volans, George Crumb, György Kurtág and Jacob ter Veldhuis. He performed solos in various orchestras conducted by, among others: Valeri Gergiev, Edo de Waart, Ernest Bour, Lev Markiz, Frans Brüggen, Roy Goodman and Ton Koopman. Schneeman also conducted the National Youth Orchestra, the Amsterdam Sinfonietta, the Brabant Orchestra and the North Netherlands Symphony Orchestra. As a soloist, conductor and in his capacity in the Netherlands Wind Ensemble, he is often asked for stage performances in all kinds of festivals and events worldwide. Schneemann is a professor at Royal Conservatory of The Hague.

== Netherlands Wind Ensemble - Nederlands Blazers Ensemble ==
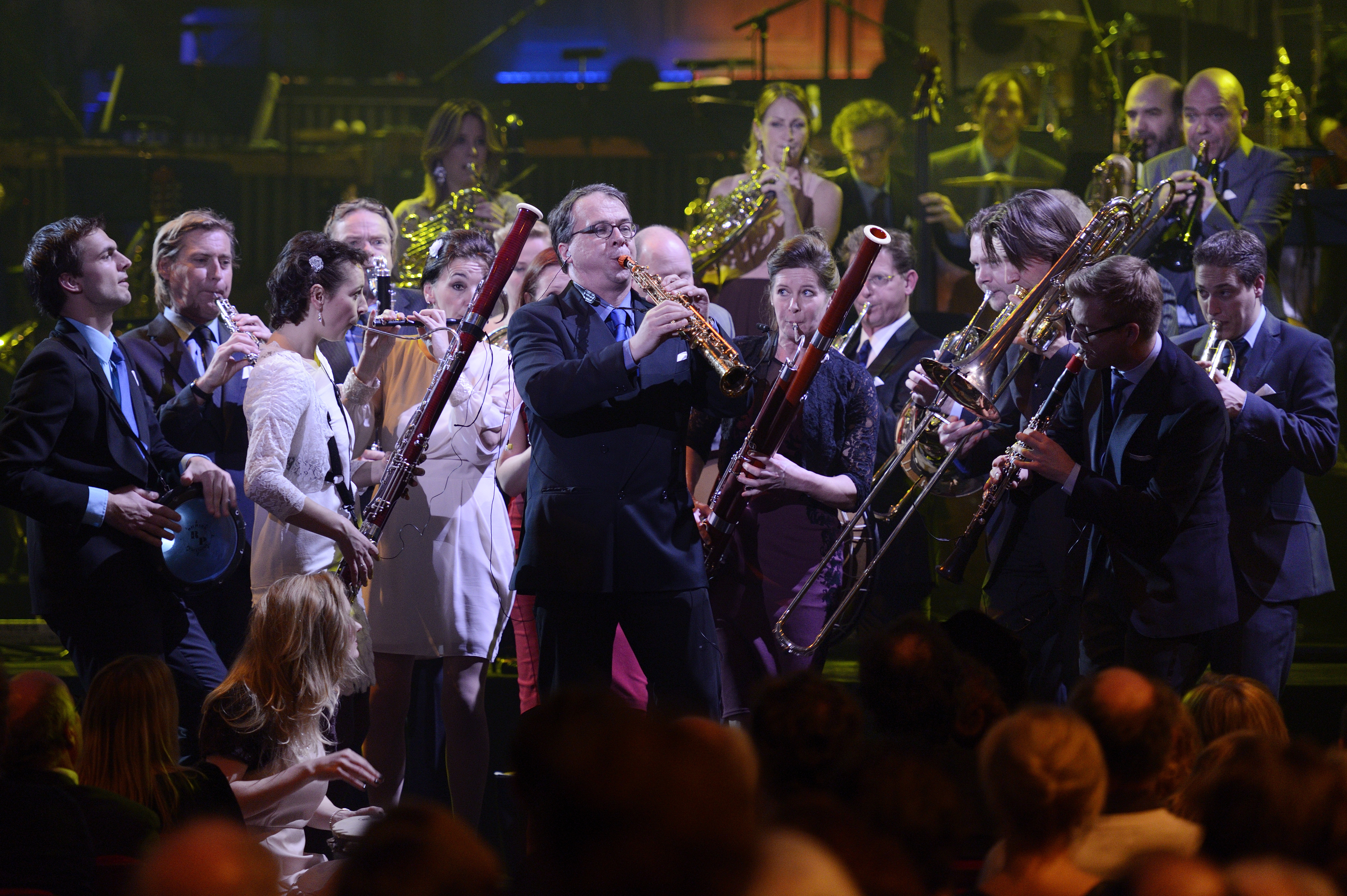
Bart Schneemann (2nd from left) and the Netherlands Wind Ensemble

In 1988, Schneemann was asked to breathe new life into the Netherlands Wind Ensemble (NBE), founded in 1961. His arrival transformed the ensemble into an enthusiastic group of young musicians with an open-minded ear for various music genres. With Johan Dorrestein, he established the NBE as a flexible company in the Dutch music world, a point of reference being the New Year's concerts in the Royal Concertgebouw in Amsterdam, which are aired live on TV. As the NBE concert programmer, Schneemann has developed his own special signature. Apart from the high quality in the ensemble's playing and infectious amusement, he aims for a dramatic line bringing music genres (and people) from different backgrounds together in every programme. With various educational programmes, the NBE provides guidance for young wind players and composers on their way to concert stages and conservatory.

The NBE has a special connection with the Dutch royal family. The ensemble accompanied Queen Beatrix on three state visits (to Thailand, India and Turkey). On 30 April 2013, the NBE will be playing at Prince Willem-Alexander’s coronation. Schneemann will also be putting together the music programme for the celebrations for Queen Beatrix in Ahoy in Rotterdam on 14 September 2013.
