= Music of Omaha =

Music in Omaha, Nebraska, has been a diverse and important influence in the culture of the city. Long a home to jazz, blues, funk and rock, today Omaha has dozens of subgenres represented, including Latin, alternative rock and hip-hop. Omaha's historical music contributions include being the home of a thriving African American music scene from the 1920s. More recently, it is home to indie rock's "Omaha Sound" and the birthplace of one of pop music's most successful producers, Terry Lewis.

== Institutions and venues ==
The Dreamland Ballroom was located at 2221–2225 North 24th Street in North Omaha on the second floor of the Jewell Building. Opening in 1923, it became the premier nightclub for big bands and jazz in Omaha. James Jewell, Jr. booked the original Nat King Cole Trio for $25 a person for one show. Other performances included Dinah Washington, Earl Hines, Duke Ellington, Count Basie, Louis Armstrong, Dizzy Gillespie and Lionel Hampton. Dreamland closed in the 1960s. Today the renovated Jewell Building is used for offices and apartments.

Although Sokol Auditorium and its sister space Sokol Underground have been a concert hot spot for many years, the city has recently seen a rise in other indie music venues. These newer venues include The Waiting Room (created by One Percent Productions, an Omaha-based booking company), Rock'N'Jocks (formerly the Rock), and The Mosaic. There are numerous other smaller venues and coffee shops that offer nightly performances. The recently opened Slowdown complex, located near the CenturyLink Center, is a Saddle Creek-generated complex of a music venue, shops (such as Urban Outfitters), restaurants, and apartments.

Recent developments in the Omaha music scene include the closing of the Cog Factory, The 49'r Lounge, and the Ranch Bowl, three prominent venues that helped launch the current Omaha music scene. Two new developments are Slowdown, a new recording space for Saddle Creek Records located on the edge of downtown Omaha, and One Percent Productions' venue, The Waiting Room Lounge. In addition to The Waiting Room Lounge, the Benson area features prominent venues, including The Barley Street Tavern, reputed to be the bar with the best acoustics for live music in Omaha due to its 'double barrel' layout. The 402 is another venue that has good live music in the Benson area. Also, the Omaha Blues, Jazz, & Gospel Festival and the Omaha Black Music Hall of Fame both celebrate African American music in Omaha. In 2009, the nonprofit MAHA Music Festival featuring rock music was held along Omaha's riverfront, which has become an annual summer event. In July 2011, the Metropolitan Entertainment and Convention Authority (MECA) hosted more than 50 bands for the first annual Red Sky Music Festival at TD Ameritrade Park.

== History of music in Omaha ==
From the 1920s through the early 1960s the Near North Side neighborhood has an entertainment district that featured African American music. The main artery of North 24th Street was the heart of the city's African-American cultural and business community, with a jazz and rhythm and blues scene that attracted top-flight swing, blues and jazz bands from across the country.

The most important venue was the storied Dreamland Ballroom, which was opened in the Jewell Building in 1923 at 24th and Grant Streets in the Near North Side neighborhood. Dreamland hosted some of the greatest jazz, blues, and swing performers, including Duke Ellington, Count Basie, Louis Armstrong, Lionel Hampton, and the original Nat King Cole Trio. Whitney Young spoke there as well. Other venues included Jim Bell's Harlem, opened in 1935 on Lake Street, west of 24th; McGill's Blue Room, located at 24th and Lake, and Allen's Showcase Lounge, which was located at 24th and Lake. Due to racial segregation, musicians such as Cab Calloway stayed at Myrtle Washington's at 22nd and Willis while others stayed at Charlie Trimble's at 22nd and Seward. The intersection of 24th and Lake was the setting of the Big Joe Williams song "Omaha Blues".

=== North Omaha musicians ===
North Omaha used to be a hub for black jazz musicians, 'the triple-A league' where national bands would go to find a player to fill out their ensemble.

— Preston Love

George T. McPherson was known as Omaha's first prominent black musician, arriving in Omaha in the early 1870s and opening a music studio there. Mcpherson was called by Thomas P. Mahammitt's Enterprise "the leading pianist of the [African-American] race".

Early North Omaha bands included Lewis' Excelsior Brass Band, Dan Desdunes Band, Simon Harrold's Melody Boys, the Sam Turner Orchestra, the Ted Adams Orchestra, and the Omaha Night Owls, as well as Red Perkins and His Original Dixie Ramblers. Lloyd Hunter's Serenaders who became the first Omaha band to record in 1931. A Lloyd Hunter concert poster can be seen on display at the Community Center in nearby Mineola, Iowa. Nat Towles was a renowned territory band leader based in Omaha. The National Orchestra Service was an important company based in Omaha that managed white, black and integrated territorial bands.

North Omaha's musical culture also birthed several nationally and internationally reputable African American musicians. International Jazz legend Preston Love, and influential drummer Buddy Miles were all friends while they grew up and played together. They collaborated throughout their lives, and while they were playing with the greatest names in Rock and Roll, Jazz, R&B and Fund. Funk band leader Lester Abrams is also from North Omaha. Omaha-born Wynonie Harris, one of the founders of rock and roll, got his start at the North Omaha clubs and for a time lived in the now-demolished Logan Fontenelle Housing Projects at 2213 Charles Street.

One of Omaha's most notable musicians of the 1940s was Anna Mae Winburn. As the leader of North Omaha's Cotton Club Boys, which included the amazing guitarist Charlie Christian, Winburn traveled the local region as a typical territorial band. However, upon the advice of Jimmie Jewell, owner of the Jewel Building, Winburn left Omaha and hit the "big time" with the International Sweethearts of Rhythm.

Another notable artist was Lalomie (Lomie) Washburn. Born in North Omaha, she went on to write songs and sing backup with such legends as Chaka Khan, Rufus, Stevie Wonder and Aretha Franklin. She signed with the Parachute label in 1977, where she released her first album "My Music is Hot". She went on to launch a solo career, which drew a large following in Germany in the 1970s and 1980s. In 1992 she released several 12" singles, and in 1997 a second (self-titled) solo album. She came back to Omaha to do a small tour when in her mid-seventies. She died on September 18, 2004, in Los Angeles. In 2005 she was inducted into the Omaha Black Music Hall of Fame.

== Classical music ==
Beginning in 1871 until the end of the century, Omaha built several opera theaters with considerable seating capacities. The largest of these, the Creighton Orpheum Theater, built in 1895, is the principal home of Opera Omaha, which was founded in 1958. It is now considered a major regional opera house that has had several major commissions and premieres.

The Omaha Symphony Orchestra, founded in 1921, is also a major regional orchestra. The symphony is based at the Holland Performing Arts Center.

== New Age/Rock ==
In the 1970s, Chip Davis worked for an Omaha advertising agency writing jingles. The agency created a series of commercials starring a fictional truck driver name C.W. McCall. One of the songs McCall sang became a single called "Convoy". The single became a part of a CB radio craze in 1975 and a movie of the same name was made starring Kris Kristofferson. Davis left the firm and recorded an album called Fresh Aire at the studio he used previously, Sound Recorders. He released the album under the name Mannheim Steamroller. Fresh Aire became a series of releases and achieved great popularity, Davis won a Grammy Award for the seventh album in the Fresh Aire series. In 1984, Mannheim Steamroller Christmas was released and its version of "Deck the Halls" became a radio hit. Davis' Christmas tour had its 25th anniversary in 2015.

== Pop music ==
Pop music producer Terry Lewis was born in Omaha in 1956. The second half of one of the most successful production teams in the history of recorded music, Lewis contributed to the success of a variety of modern stars, including Janet Jackson.

Singer-songwriter Criss Starr started his music career performing at venues in North Omaha under the tutelage of James Boone, founder and bassist for the band ‘Highlighters & Rhythm Machine,’ and owner of Go Ahead Magazine. Criss Starr has recorded and released songs with former members of Prince’s band ‘The Revolution,’ and recently performed shows in Tokyo, Japan. Criss Starr’s family lived in Omaha’s Spencer Apartments public housing complex.

== Modern African American music ==
While African Americans have contributed greatly to the history of music in Omaha, they continue to impress black culture upon the city and the country as a whole. Other artists from Omaha's modern African American music scene include Thomas Wilkins, current director of the Omaha Symphony Orchestra, and Lois "Lady Mac" McMorris, a lead guitarist and vocalist.

== Hip-hop ==
Omaha is also home to a growing underground hip-hop scene. For a long time, the scene was defined by North High School graduate Houston Alexander, a.k.a. Scrib or FAS/ONE. In the 1980s he led a hip-hop movement in North Omaha called the Scribble Crew as an alliance of graffiti writers who developed a reputation as the top tag artists in the area. The art stands today at 24th and Binney Streets, to 16th and Corby Streets, and other North Omaha locations, and is still respected by the community. His Midwest Alliance act was active through the 1990s and into the new millennium, and is seen as influential on the Omaha scene. Other artists from the late 80's that helped push the early years of hip-hop in Omaha was the Young Rebels who had a semi-major record deal and an import of Offutt Air Force Base named Suavey Spy (Orlando Barnett) and his local DJ Disco Rick. Today Alexander is a DJ on a local radio station in Omaha that hosts an independent music show featuring hip-hop, and he facilitates an elementary school program that teaches students about hip-hop called the "Culture Shock School Tour". Alexander has also been vocal about Omaha's lack of support for its hip-hop artists.

OTR Entertainment, also under the alias of OTR Familia or OTR Fam, specializing in Latin hip-hop with offices in South Omaha, NE and Chicago, features a variety of artists on their label, including Xpreshin a.k.a. XP Brigante, OMC, and Mix Of Combinations a.k.a. MOC. Currently with three projects on their resume, Xpreshin and Prominence 'The Commencement', OMC's 'It Is What It Is' and 'It Takes What It Took' and MOC with OTR Afta School's 'The Curriculum' featuring K2theillest and Young Nikko . OTR Entertainment has had artists open up for acts such as Latin sensation bachata group Aventura, Kumbia Kings, Krazy Race, and Pitbull. OTR Entertainment has also had artists that have collaborated with heavy hitters Krazy Race, underground hip-hop legend from California and Armageddon, former member of Fat Joe's Terror Squad and executive producer of Fat Joe's J.O.S.E album. Jerry Wade, a.k.a. DJ Kamikaze, was first a member of Omaha's Posse-N-Effect. Their first show was in 1989 in Miller Park in North Omaha. Pigeon John, an increasingly popular Christian rapper, is originally from Omaha. Cerone Thompson, known as Scrybe, has had a number one single on college radio stations across the United States. He has also had several number one hits on the local hip-hop station respectively titled, "Lose Control" and "Do What U Do".

Mars Black, perhaps the Omaha rapper with the most national exposure, has released an album on New York City's Team Love Records label. However, in a review of the Mars Black album Folks Music, one reviewer noted that Mars describes the Omaha hip-hop scene as "almost non-existent". Continuing about the album, the reviewer writes, "It's only in such a desolate music environment that his pitiful flow, painfully corny emo-rhymes, and insulting bling-boasts could exist."

The Raleigh Science Project Founded in 2009 by Omaha Rapper and Producer Marcey Yates aka Op2mus is a music and arts collective that focuses on growth, development, artist branding and community event planning. The collective includes Omaha rappers Mars Black, Mark Patrick and Xoboi. In 2016 The Raleigh Science Project held it first annual music and arts festival " The New Generation Music Festival".

Original 5 Productions was founded in 2001 by Tomas Contreras in Omaha, NE. This cutting edge label's sole purpose is to break into the mainstream music industry while keeping its roots firmly planted in the Midwest. The label has had two major releases in its short existence; its very own CEO's Tomas Contreras’ release of "Reborn In Tha Mind" (available at all Homers Record stores) under the alias Tomas C and "The Eclipse is Season…The World is Ours" (also available at all Homers Record Stores) a group effort including 3 members: Tomas C, Durrtee a.k.a. Albert Cuadra and Big Purp a.k.a. Dj Poppa Lock a.k.a. Ernesto Gomez under the name Tha Originators. Durrtee is from the bayarea and brought lyrical content and introduced the "hyphy" movement to the midwest. Original 5 Productions latest release is Tomas C's sophomore album “The Resurrection of Killer Cortez EP” released June 2011.

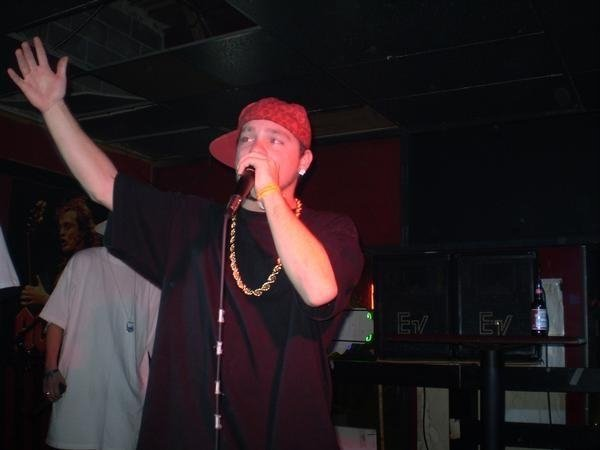
DavieBoi Playin Concert in 2008

Other recently released artists include Afta Lyfe on Straight Ball'n Records, King Iso Teezus Christ, Lil Christ Kross who is from Decatur Ga Kross's album No Major Still Major Originally released in 2017 With Viral Hit's Birdman, and also Pick Up That Cash Features Adam22 of the Viral Youtube Show No Jumper, Teezus Christ, and Junior Biggs. Cornbread on Outta Bounds Records, and Toot on Utopia Entertainment. Big Mista (Redemption, Back For the First Time, For the Last Time), Articulate, ShYnE, Chet Chapman, Dark Reign, Ice Money, D' Cypher, Crazze Chris (crazzechrisofficial), Ty-G & Drew Beatz, H.O.B Records, Papillion X, Benny Salz, DavieBoi, Dark Reign, Big Burn, Buck Bowen, Block Movement with Stylo and Latin Threat, El Genius, Aceo Tha Future, Guerrilla X, Dubbsixx, Foolie Auto, R.E.D., Prophecy, K2theillest, Verze, Galantz, Yung Smokeout, Murder Game, Ellmatiq P-tro, Rush-1, Conchance, Black Jonny Quest, D-Lo, Saint Patrick, Ramm, Jamazz, and Surreal The MC of Noizewave Tomas C of Original 5 Productions Durtee a.k.a. Albert Cuadra Purp Nasty a.k.a. Ernesto Gomez of Original 5 Productions Galvanized Tron (J.Stephens Music) are some of Omaha's most frequent live hip-hop performers.

Today many hip-hop shows are held at the Sokol Auditorium in Omaha's Little Bohemia, as well as The Waiting Room, The Slowdown, The Reverb Lounge and The Lookout Lounge.

Grammy nominated, Terrace Martin spent his summers in Omaha and learned the Omaha sound and picked up the saxophone. His father is noted Omaha jazz drummer, Curly Martin.

Omaha hip-hop acts from 2013 to 2019 include BOTH aka BXTH(2014 Best Hip Hop OEAA), M34N STR33T (2013 Artist of the Year & Best Hip Hop OEAA)members are rapper Conny Franko & beat maker producer Haunted Gauntlet, Third Eye Merchants, S1SW aka R0t, Black Jonny Quest, Dilla Kids, Marcey Yates, XoBoi, J.Crum, Articulate, Max Fischer, R0ach & Cool Drug Music.

== Surf music in Omaha ==
One of Omaha's most famous exports is the influential surf band The Chevrons, who were voted Omaha's most popular band in 1966. Other 1960s surf and rock bands from Omaha include The Echos, 7 Legends, Velvet Haze, Little Denny Wonder, Freedom Road and The Beautiful People. Wee Willie and The Rockin Angels broke all attendance records at The Peony Park Ballroom (National Historic Landmark on the Lincoln Highway). Currently there are a handful of surf rock bands in the Big O including The Subvectors.

== Indie rock music ==
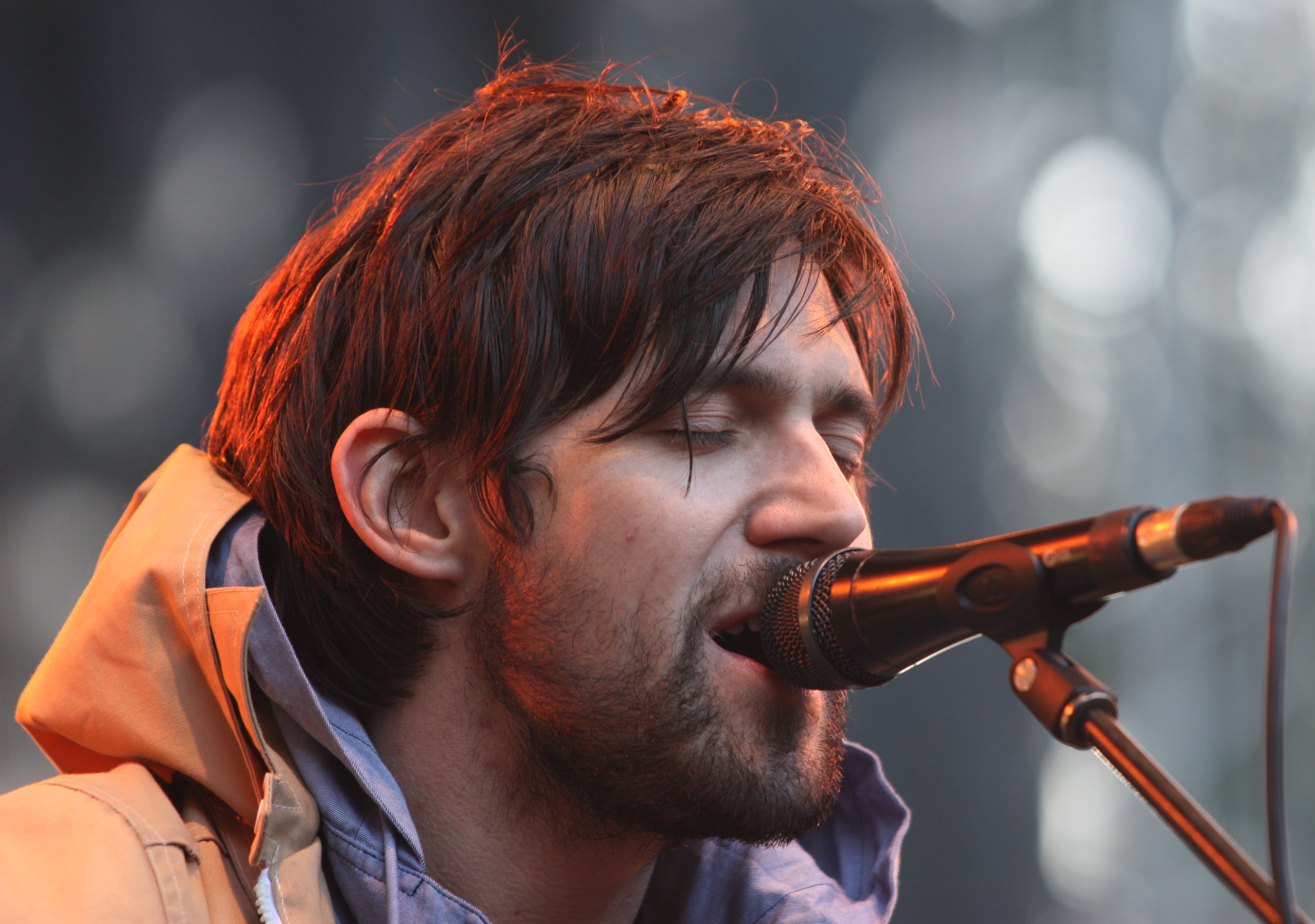
Conor Oberst, born in Omaha and currently operating two record labels there, has founded and played with many successful national bands: Monsters of Folk, Conor Oberst and the Mystic Valley Band, Desaparecidos, Bright Eyes, Park Ave., The Magnetas, Commander Venus, and The Faint. He is currently enjoying success as a solo artist.

Indie rock bands on the Saddle Creek record label out of Omaha, Nebraska, include notable artists such as Bright Eyes, The Faint, and Cursive. These bands are playing a significant role in the current national rock scene. The formation of the sound occurred in the mid-1990s with Commander Venus, Frontier Trust, Ritual Device, Clever, Twitch, Steve Walton and The Flash Action Band, Mousetrap, Solid Jackson, Fast Orange, and clubs such as the Cog Factory, and Sokol Music Hall. Many people involved in these bands and venues are currently involved with Saddle Creek.

Other related aspects of the Omaha indie music include various alternative bands. The alternative music scene has produced such popular artists as 311, Grasshopper Takeover, The Seen, The Good Life, Civicminded, MANNA, Criteria, A Moment Lost, High Up, Dim Light, Ladyfinger (ne), Icares, Shelter Belt, Go Crash Audio, Tilly and the Wall, Dead Wave, and Secret Kitten & the Holy Steamroller. Omaha has been a temporary home base of other Indie bands such as Rilo Kiley and Azure Ray.

Tim McMahan's Lazy-i, the Omaha World-Herald hearnebraska.org, omahype.com, the Worlds of Wayne podcast, SLAM (Support Local Art & Music) Omaha, and The Reader alt-weekly are among the main media outlets promoting the Omaha music scene.

Other mainstays of the music scene in Omaha include singer-songwriters such as Conor Oberst, Tim Kasher, Clark Baechle, Todd Fink, Maria Taylor, Orenda Fink, Simon Joyner, Sarah Benck, Chris Saub, Korey Anderson, Brad Hoshaw, and David Sacco.

An integral part of the Nebraska music scene are three Omaha-based record labels: American Gramaphone, Saddle Creek Records, Team Love Records. American Gramaphone was founded in 1974 by classically trained composer/musician Chip Davis;Saddle Creek Records was founded in 1993 by Conor Oberst and Justin Oberst. Oberst founded Team Love in 2003 in part due to his frustration at not being able to sign and showcase talent quickly enough through the Saddle Creek label.

Other significant music venues currently include The Waiting Room Lounge, The Slowdown, The Sydney, The Barley Street Tavern, O'Leaver's Pub, Sokol Underground, The Hideout (now The Lookout Lounge), The B Side (of The Benson Theatre), The Hole, The Sandbox, and Barfly.

Omaha indie rock bands from 2012 to 2019 include Capgun Coup, Talkin Mountain aka Jason Steady, Haunted Gauntlet aka adamroberthauG, Bear Country, no.i'm.the.pilot, Howard, Thunder Power, Honey Bee, Baby Walrus, Gus & Call, Our Hearts Are Stars, Flamboyant Gods, Flowers Forever, Icky Blossoms, Places We Slept, Glow in the Dark, The Benningtons, The Derby Birds, Noahs Ark Was A Spaceship, See Through Dresses, Junior Varsity, Eric in Outerspace & The Regulation.

== Hard rock ==
Omaha has many heavier rock acts. Doug Ingle was the lead vocalist and organist in the late 60's band Iron Butterfly. Since the turn of the millennium, it has been a strong spot for Metalcore bands. A good amount have gone on to be national acts such as Narcotic Self, Analog, Paria, System Failure, I Am Legend and Venaculas. It also draws many other heavy musical acts, strongly of the Screamo genre (including bands Sutter Cane, Caught in the Fall, after*forever, & Robots Don't Cry). Other notable local groups include Back When, Father, Hercules, Keeper of the Morgue, and Bloodcow. An act that toured the midwest is Social Outcast, led by local Omaha singer-songwriter Joshua Harris. Another act, edgy and blues-based, is Steve Erlewine's band, 80-pruuf. A newer hard rock band is Sherry Drive.

== Country ==
In 1973, while working as a creative director for Bozell & Jacobs, an Omaha, Nebraska advertising agency, William Dale Fries, Jr. created a Clio Award-winning (1974) television advertising campaign advertising Old Home Bread for the Metz Baking Company using a pseudonym C. W. McCall. Fries wrote the lyrics and sang while Chip Davis wrote the music. As McCall, this led to a career for Fries as a truck-themed outlaw country musician. Many of his songs tended to be humorous or amusing, some also had serious commentary rooted in environmental conservation & protection issues of their day. McCall is best known for the 1976 No. 1 hit song "Convoy", which came at the peak of the CB fad in the United States and spent six weeks at number one on the country charts and one week at number one on the pop charts. The record was one of the fastest-selling in record industry history, won the Country Music "Artist of the Year" and "Writers of the Year" awards for its creators, and inspired a feature film starring Kris Kristofferson.

Omaha also has a number of current country, country western and modern country artists, including lead singer Jolie Edwards of Jolie & the Wanted.

== Jazz and funk ==
Omaha has a thriving jazz, funk, and jam-rock scene that would be considered the current underground movement in the area. Bands like The 9's, Polydypsia, Artillery Funk, Video Ranger, Satchel Grande, Lucas Kellison and Assembled Soul, Sarah Benck and the Robbers, Funk Trek, Slang 5 and Anchondo head up the music in this genre. Popular bands of the past in this area include The Confidentials, Strange Pleasures, Electric Soul Method, The Kind, and The Jazzwholes. Drummer Victor Lewis was born in Omaha.

== See also ==
- Culture in Omaha, Nebraska
- Culture in North Omaha, Nebraska
- Bright Eyes (band)
- Darrin's Coconut Ass: Live from Omaha
- Maha music festival
- Saddle Creek Records
- Sorry About Dresden
- Sparkle Moore
