= Cotton Club Boys (territory band) =

The Cotton Club Boys was a territory band based in North Omaha, Nebraska, in the 1930s. It was initially fronted by Anna Mae Winburn.

== About ==
Personnel in the swing band included a variety of players. Trumpets players included Lloyd Hunter, Park King, Willie Long and Raymond Byron. The reed section included Bill Owens, Harold Johnson, James Bytheweek and Gene McDonald. Dave Finny was the pianist, and Ike Welch was on guitar. FeBoe Mills played bass, and William Kyles and Anna Mae Winburn were vocalists.

== See also ==
- Culture of North Omaha, Nebraska
- Music of Omaha
