= Omaha Black Music Hall of Fame =

American nonprofit organization

The Omaha Black Music Hall of Fame, or the OBMHoF, is a nonprofit organization founded in 2005 to celebrate, document and honour the legacy of the many top vocalists and musicians whose musical careers began in the metropolitan area of Omaha, Nebraska. It has a particular focus on African American music from North Omaha, and is committed to honoring Omaha's blues tradition from the 1920s to the present day. The OBMHoF holds induction ceremonies every two years that highlight, but are not limited to, classical, rhythm & blues, big band, jazz and gospel music.

== About ==
Vaughn Chatman, a former Omaha rhythm-and-blues player and attorney in Sacramento, California, formed the Omaha Black Music Hall of Fame in 2005. According to one local newspaper, the Hall of Fame was formed to acknowledge Omaha's own musicians. "Enough Omaha artists have impacted the industry to rival the legacy from historical music hotbeds like Kansas City, Mo. The contributions of these Omaha-bred-and-born may add up to one of black music’s largest untold stories." Omaha's significance has been better known as a venue for nationally popular African American jazz, blues and rock greats, many of whom performed at the Dreamland Ballroom.

== Ceremonies ==
The Omaha Black Music Hall of Fame hold ceremonies every two years to coincide with the bi-annual Native Omaha Days event, which draws thousands to the Near North Omaha neighborhood to celebrate the history of the African American community in Omaha. It's ceremonies have different locations, and there are varying numbers of inductees every biennium.

=== 2005 ===
The first inductions to the Omaha Black Music Hall of Fame were in 2005. The induction ceremony was held on 4 August 2005 at Harrah's Casino in neighboring Council Bluffs, Iowa. There were 40 inductees:

=== 2007 ===
The 2007 Omaha Black Music Hall Of Fame inductions ceremony was held at Qwest Center, Omaha. Other musical awards were made in the Gospel/Civic/Sports Awards Ceremony, and the Blues/Classical/Jazz/R&B Awards Ceremony.

"The Omaha Black Music Hall of Fame inductees are inspirational community leaders, exceptional musicians and vocalists, including gospel pioneers who left their mark on the civic and music scene. This includes top civic leaders, musicians and vocalists who started in Omaha and moved on to other cities to pursue professional and music careers."

In 2007 there were 67 total inductees into the Hall, including 23 who were deceased and 54 living. They represented a variety of music genres and connections to Omaha's Black music community. The categories included gospel, R&B, Jazz, Rock & Roll and Classical music.

=== 2011 ===
The 2011 inductions to the Omaha's Black Music Hall of Fame were held on July 29, 2011 at the Slowdown in Omaha, Nebraska. MAN vs MAN Band's historic performance at the awards ceremony celebrated a 40-year concert reunion. Other artist performing at the event included: Maxayn, Ahnjel, Sam Singleton, and Hank Redd Jr. The 2011 inductees to the Omaha Black Music Hall of Fame were: Hank Redd Jr., Jeanne Rogers, Charles "Chuck" Miller, Red Higgins, Bertha Myers, Adrienne Higgins Brown-Norman, Preston Love, Sam Singleton, Maxayn Lewis, MAN vs MAN Band: Walter McKinney, Len Harris M.D., Donald Harris, Kevin Harris, Glenn Franklin, Lonzo Franklin, Melvin Hall, Leroi Brashears, & Nils Anders Erickson; The New Breed of Soul Band and Andre Davis. web page.

== Recipients ==
Inductee	Born	Died	Active from	Major Skill(s)	OBMHoF profile	Notes
Lester Abrams	1945		1960s	drummer, vocalist, keyboardist, songwriter, producer		
Wali Ali			1970s	Guitarist, singer		
Donnie Beck	1951		1970s	Drummer, bass guitar, organ, piano, singer, composer, arranger		(Note: Jeanne Rogers is mother of twins Carol and Keith Rogers, and twins Donnie and Ron E. Beck.)
Ron E. Beck	1951		1970s	Drummer, singer, composer		
Larry Bell	1941	2004	1960s	Guitar, piano, drums, saxophone		(Note: Larry Bell also had a degree in Tailoring and designed many of his bands' costumes.)
Percy Le'Roy Chatman		1990	1950s	Singer		(Note: Percy Chatman, also known as "Mr. Omaha", was the brother of Vaughn Chatman who formed the Omaha Black Music Hall of Fame.)
Wesley Devereaux	1933	2025	1950s	Singer		(Note: Wesley Devereaux is the son of Wynonie Harris)
Joe Leslie Edmonson	1947	2002	1960s	Organist		(Note: "Lil" Joe Edmonson was known for his philanthropic accomplishments with his youth foundation.)
Glenn Franklin			1970's	Drummer, Percussionist, Vocalist		2011 Inductee OBMHoF
Lonzo Franklin		2009	1970's	Vocalist, Songwriter		2011 Inductee OBMHoF
King Richard Gardner	1932	2016	1950s	Guitar		(Note: Richard Gardner owned four barbershops in Omaha for 46 years. They were well known as a meeting place for aspiring musicians.)
Vernon Garrett			1960s	Singer		
Melvin Hall.			1970's	Bass Guitar, Acoustic Bass, Vocalist		2011 Inductee OBMHoF
Donald Harris.			1970's	Tenor, Alto and Soprano Sax, Vocalist, Songwriter, Producer		2011 Inductee OBMHoF
Kevin Harris.			1970's	Trombone, Vocalist, Drummer, Songwriter		2011 Inductee OBMHoF
Len Harris.			1960s	Keyboardist, Organist, Songwriter, Producer, Recording Engineer		Recording profile aka "The Duke" , also known for his Perfect Pitch note recognition abilities. 2011 Inductee OBMHoF
Wynonie Harris, aka "Mr. Blues"	1915	1969	1940s	Singer		
Lloyd Hunter		1961	1920s	Trumpeter, Band Leader		
Stemsy Hunter (Stemziel Hunter)			1960s	Saxophone		
Sylvester (Syl) Johnson (deceased)	1948		1970s	Singer		
Helen Jones Woods	1925		1940s	Trombone		
Calvin Keys	1942		1960s	jazz guitarist		
Michael Andre Lewis			1960s	Singer, keyboards, synthesizers, band leader, composer, producer		
Merle Lewis			1970s	Singer		(Note: For a period, Merle Lewis used the stage name "Dianna St. Clair")
Victor Lewis	1950		1960s	Drummer		
Preston Love	1921	2004	1940s	Alto sax, Band Leader		
Arno Lucas			1970s	Singer, songwriter		
Eugene "Booker" McDaniels			1950s	Songwriter, producer		
Walter McKinney			1960's	Guitarist, Songwriter, Vocalist, Studio Musician		2011 Inductee OBMHoF; Performed and recorded with many artists including Rose Royce
Lois “Lady Mac” McMorris			1970s	Lead guitar, rhythm guitar, upright bass, electric bass, keyboards, drum programmer, arranger, vocalist, composer		(Note: "Lady Mac" is also an award-winning painter & sculptor, a graphic artist/designer, a poet and author, clairvoyant, a natural healer, and an ordained minister.)
Ernest "Curly" Martin			1960s	Drummer/percussionist		
Buddy Miles (George Miles)	1945	2008	1960s	Drums, vocals, band leader		
Professor Charles Miller			1970s	Trumpeter, conductor		(Note: Professor Miller also has a distinguished career as an educator, academic and author.)
Ruth Norman			1950s	Composer, pianist		
Mason Prince			1950s	Trumpet		
Billy Rich			1950s	Electric Bass Guitar		(Note: Billy, Carolyn and Herbie Rich are siblings.)
Carolyn Rich			1960s	Vocalist		
Herbie Rich		2004	1950s	Keyboards, saxophone, singer		
Billy Rogers	1950	1987	1970s	Guitarist		
Carol Jean Rogers	1954		1970s	Singer		
Jeanne Rogers	1934		1960s	Pianist, singer		
Keith Rogers	1954		1980s	Producer		
Sam Singleton.	1943		1960s	Promoter, Producer, Vocalist		2011 Inductee OBMHoF
Leslie Orlando Smith	1949		1970s	Singer		
Steppen Stonz	1972		1970s	Three vocalists supported by two musicians (drums and keyboards)		
Luigi Waites			1950s	percussionist		
Lalomie (Lomie) Washburn		2004	1960s	Singer, songwriter		
Richetta (Lewis) Wilson			1950s	Singer		

During the ceremony the Steppen Stonz were also awarded a "Showcase Legend Award".

== See also ==
- Culture of North Omaha, Nebraska
- Music of Omaha
- List of music museums
