= Nat Towles =

American musician, jazz and big band leader (1905–1963)

- Born: Nat Towles; August 10, 1905; New Orleans, Louisiana, United States
- Died: January 1963 Berkeley, California, United States
- Genres: Jazz music Big band
- Occupation: Bandleader
- Instrument: String bass

Nat Towles (August 10, 1905 – January 1963) was an American musician, jazz and big band leader popular in his hometown of New Orleans, Louisiana, North Omaha, Nebraska and Chicago, Illinois. He was also music educator in Austin, Texas. (Note: Towles' band in Austin composed of students studying music at Wiley College included Fred Beckett and Henry Coker, Trombones; Paul King and Nat Bates, trumpets; Buddy Tate, tenor saxophone; C.Q. Price, alto saxophone; Towles, bass; and Duke Groner, vocals. Charles Thompson left Lloyd Hunter's band to take the piano spot. (Russell)) The Nat Towles band is considered one of the greatest territory bands of all time by musicians who played in it and by others who heard it.

== Life ==
The son of string bassist Phil "Charlie" Towles, Nat was born in New Orleans, Louisiana, on August 10, 1905. Starting his musical career as a guitarist and violinist at the age of 11, Towles switched to the bass at the age of 13. He performed in New Orleans through his teenage years with Gus Metcalf's Melody Jazz Band, eventually playing with a number of bands, including those of Buddie Petit, Henry "Red" Allen, Jack Carey, and the Original Tuxedo Jazz Orchestra.

In 1923 he formed The Nat Towles' Creole Harmony Kings. This jazz band became one of the prominent territory bands in Texas, Oklahoma, Kansas, and Nebraska. In 1925 he played bass for Fate Marable, and reformed his own band the next year. In 1934, Towles organized a band of young musicians studying music at Wiley College in Austin, Texas. Towles also worked a club circuit in Dallas during this period, reportedly working for a gangster who owned 26 nightclubs throughout the city. During this period T-Bone Walker and Buddy Tate worked for Towles.

In the 1930s Towles transformed his band into The Nat Towles Dance Orchestra, signed with the National Orchestra Service, and focused on swing music through the 1930s and 1940s. In 1934 Towles took up residence in North Omaha, Nebraska, where his band was stationed for the next 25 years. With this outfit Towles dueled with Lloyd Hunter for dominance over the much-contested Near North Side in North Omaha, where he was held over at the Dreamland Ballroom for several weeks. In 1936 and 1937 Towles' band held residence at Omaha's Krug Park.

In 1943 he also held a three-month stint at the Rhumboogie Club in Chicago, and later that year took up residency again in Omaha's Dreamland Ballroom. Billy Mitchell played with him during that period. That year Towles also played extensively throughout New York City, including an appearance at the Apollo Theater. Notable players in the dance orchestra included trombonist Buster Cooper and saxophonists Red Holloway, Buster Bennett and Preston Love. Towles continued leading bands throughout the 1950s.

In 1959 Towles retired to California to open a bar. He died in Berkeley, California, of a heart attack in January 1963.

== Influence ==
Despite a 1940 issue of Billboard magazine listing Towles as producing "Best Patronage Reaction", his work did not find true national recognition. He feared the limelight would then steal away his best players. For this reason there are very few recordings of Nat Towles' Band.

In his role as their bandleader, Towles is credited with influencing a variety of musicians including Sir Charles Thompson and Neal Hefti, as well as saxophonists Jimmy Heath, Oliver Nelson, and Paul Quinichette. As an educator, Towles influenced many younger musicians such as pianist Duke Groner and trombonist Buddy McLewis (aka Joe McLewis).

== See also ==
- Culture in North Omaha, Nebraska
- Music in Omaha, Nebraska
