= Lois McMorris =

Lois McMorris, also known as "Lady Mac", is a lead guitarist and vocalist from North Omaha, Nebraska.

== Music ==
McMorris plays lead guitar, rhythm guitar, upright bass, electric bass and keyboards and is a drum programmer. She is also a musician, arranger, vocalist, composer, chart writer and lyricist. Bands that she has been a member of include 7th House, Gutsbucket & Funk, Poverty's Movement and The Persuaders.

Lady Mac has toured the world and/or performed with a variety of popular music artists including the rapper Coolio, the jazz organist Jimmy Smith and B.B. King. Preston Love called McMorris, "one of the finest all-around guitarist to ever come from Omaha". McMorris was inducted into the Omaha Black Music Hall of Fame in 2005.

Lady Mac has recorded on Atma Records, releasing LadyMac: One As a Performing Artist. McMorris alternates between performing as a headliner with her own group, LadyMac & the MacAttack, and appearing as a headliner in jazz, blues and old-school festivals across the United States. McMorris has headlined the Omaha Jazz and Blues Festival.

== Other activities ==
McMorris has performed in the theatre and theatrical shows. Her performances include co-starring in An Evening with Four Ladies of Music with Linda Hopkins and Through Verse & Imagination, directed by Sir Preston Webster at the Jazz Bakery. She has also appeared on television, internationally, nationally, regionally, and locally, with credits on China Beach, Picket Fences, Entertainment Tonight and Eye On LA, among other shows.

An artist from infancy, McMorris is a painter and sculptor. She is also a poet and teacher, and has written a variety of works including Passages of the Transcendental Ant (an anthology of poetic works), a children's book called The Littlest, Biggest Christmas and an art-comic magazine called Zionaya of God.

== Personal ==
McMorris is a survivor of breast cancer.

== See also ==
- Culture of North Omaha, Nebraska
