= MDMP (band) =

American rock band

M D M P
- Also known as: MDMP
- Origin: Nanakuli, Hawaii, United States
- Genres: Rock, Alternative Rock, Singer-Songwriter
- Years active: 2017–present
- Labels: independent
- Members: Jeremey Meyer
- Website: http://mdmpmusic.com

MDMP is an American Rock band from Nanakuli, Hawaii, formed in 2017. Singer, songwriter, multi-instrumentalist, and producer Jeremey Meyer is currently the only permanent member of the band.

== History ==
=== Formation (2017–2018) ===
MDMP was formed after Meyer's departure from metalcore band Sherry Drive in 2017. MDMP was initially a side project started with Ratzburg & Meyer in the beginning of 2017. On July 1, 2018, the two released a demo version of the song "Coffee."

=== Day One (2018–2021) ===
MDMP's debut album Day One, came out Aug. 28, 2021 with 27.

== Musical style and influences ==
MDMP is a blend of 90s alternative rock, modern adult rock, and electronic rock. Bands of heavy influence are Foo Fighters, Alice In Chains, & Nine Inch Nails.

== Members ==
=== Current ===
- Jeremey Meyer – lead vocals, guitars, backing vocals, bass, drums, synths (2017–present)

=== Guest Musicians ===
- Anu Ratzburg
- Anton Suchkov
- EJ King
- Chris Sione
- Shayley Dayshell Bourget

== Awards ==
MDMP has achieved a #1 ranking for the Hawaii area 2017–2021 on Reverb Nation.

== Discography ==
=== Studio albums ===
- Day One (2021)

=== Singles ===
Title	Year	Album
”Coffee”	2018	Day One
"Bowl Cut"	2018	Day One
"Path To Nowhere"	2019	Day One
"Black Label"	2019	Day One
"Learn"	2020	Day One
"We Will Get Through This"	2020	Day One
"Chosen One"	2020	Day One
"Kneeling Scars"	2021	Day One
"Strength" (featuring Dayshell)	2021	Day One
