= Culture of North Omaha, Nebraska =

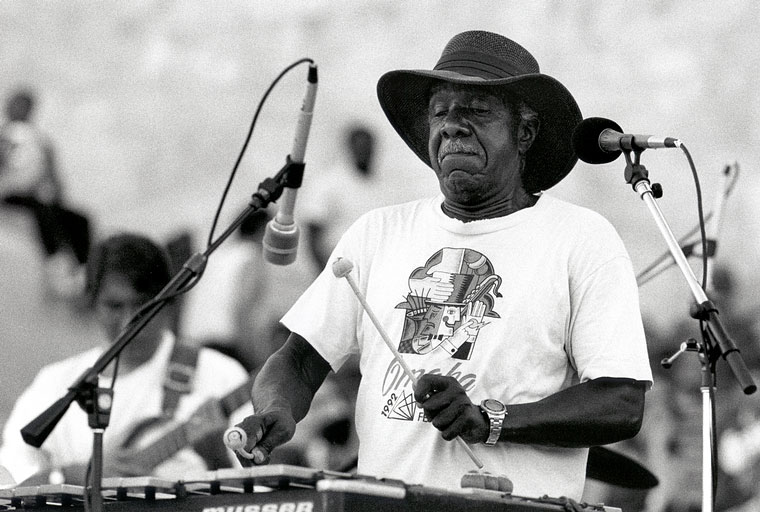
Luigi Waites playing vibraphone.

Culture in North Omaha, Nebraska, the north end of Omaha, is defined by socioeconomic, racial, ethnic and political diversity among its residents. The neighborhood's culture is largely influenced by its predominantly African American community.

== Cultural events ==
North Omaha is home to several important annual events that help define and celebrate the community, its history, and its future. Native Omaha Days is a biennial North Omaha cultural tradition, reuniting members of the city's African-American community. The Days are commemorated with a variety of events, including the Evergreen Reunion, named after the town in Alabama from where many families' ancestors migrated.

Other annual activities include the Juneteenth Parade, the Fort Omaha Intertribal Powwow, Omaha Blues, Jazz, & Gospel Festival, Florence Days, and the Omaha North High School Homecoming, including a parade for the community. The Stone Soul Picnic is also an important event.

== Cultural institutions ==
North Omaha is the location of dozens of historically and currently important cultural institutions. They include the Fair Deal Cafe, which was called the "Black City Hall" for more than 50 years. John Beasley Theater was located in the Lake Point Building at 2401 Lake St. Suite 130. It was named after native Omaha actor John Beasley. The Theater's mission was, "To provide new educational opportunities for residents to experience and develop their interests and talents in theater, dance, music, poetry and writing."

North Omaha is proud of its history as an important jazz community. Dreamland Plaza is located at 24th and Lizzie Robinson Streets, adjacent to the Dreamland Ballroom. Dreamland was the premier nightclub for jazz, blues and big band music in Omaha from the 1920s through the 1960s. The site of a recent $2 million investment by the city, it is now home to cultural activities throughout the year. The Dreamland Historical Project is set on restoring North Omaha as a jazz center. The Love’s Jazz and Art Center, located at 2510 North 24th Street, is a non-profit dedicated to showcasing, collection, documentation, preservation, study and the dissemination of the history and culture of African Americans in the arts. It is named after Omaha jazz legend Preston Love, a band leader and one-time saxophonist with Count Basie. Other influential figures on North Omaha's early scene included Lloyd Hunter, Anna Mae Winburn and her International Sweethearts of Rhythm trombonist, Helen Jones Woods. The Omaha Black Music Hall of Fame was established in 2005 to celebrate this legacy.

Formed by Bertha Calloway in the 1960s, the Negro Historical Society opened the Great Plains Black History Museum in North Omaha in 1976. The Museum is located at 2213 Lake Street, and is home to Omaha's only African-American history collection.

=== Movie theaters ===
The Diamond Moving Picture Theater, located at 24th and Lake, was flattened by the Easter Sunday tornado of 1913. After the tornado rumors circulated that hundreds had died inside the building; that proved to be untrue, as all patrons had escaped. However, the resulting collection of rescuers in that location served useful, as the majority of the dead were in that vicinity.

The Beacon Theater was located at 2910 Ames Avenue and was demolished in the early 1970s. The Corby Theatre at 2805 North 16th Street, the Lothrop Theatre at 3212 North 24th Street, the Circle Theatre at 524 North 33rd Street and the North Star Theatre at 2413 Ames Avenue opened in the 1930s. The Minne Lusa Theater was opened on North 30th Street in the Minne Lusa neighborhood in the 1930s, too. All of these theaters closed in the 1950s and some were demolished. The Cass Theatre at 500 North 16th Street was opened in the 1940s and closed in the 1950s, as well.

== European immigrant and European American culture ==
From its start in the late 19th century, near North Omaha was the location of a mixed European immigrant community that also became a center for the African-American community. The Jewish community in the area was rich, with several synagogues the provided social and cultural activities. Similarly, Catholic parishes in the area welcomed Irish and German immigrants. Far North Omaha, near Florence, was home to an almost exclusively Scandinavian immigrant community. With a variety of churches and social clubs, this neighborhood was a cultural center for many of North Omaha's working class and middle class whites. Los of industrial jobs in the late 1950s and 1960s accelerated changes in the neighborhood. It became predominantly African American and many people have suffered from unemployment.

== African American culture ==
North Omaha has long been the location of a thriving community of African Americans. Early arrivals came mostly after Reconstruction, but the greatest number of migrants came after 1910. Blacks have contributed extensively to the economic, political and moral compass of Omaha. While struggling with racial tension, many African Americans have become involved in the civil rights movement.

=== Suburbanization ===
In the late 19th century near North Omaha, closer to the downtown core, was home to many working class, middle class, and upper class WASP and Jewish families. Numerous churches, synagogues, social and civic clubs, and other cultural activities from that time continue to this day, despite the expansion of population gravitating to West Omaha in several waves of suburbanization. For instance, the City of Omaha noted in a landmark designation that Calvin Memorial Presbyterian Church, "... reflects the change of North Omaha from an affluent white suburb to a black inner city neighborhood and the manner in which many area churches were established, changed ownership and merged." Some churches and residential areas demonstrated racial discrimination. A 1966 documentary examining efforts in Omaha to change segregation was A Time for Burning.

North Omaha's working class, middle class, and upper class white history is evidenced in the architecture of many neighborhoods, several notable mansions, progressive apartment building designs, and other churches or former synagogues spread throughout the area. This is especially evident in the Kountze Place neighborhood, which is recognized as an area of historical importance for its architecture.

== See also ==
- Timeline of North Omaha, Nebraska history
- People from North Omaha, Nebraska
- List of landmarks in North Omaha, Nebraska
- Landmarks in North Omaha, Nebraska
- Culture in Omaha, Nebraska
