= Cog Factory =

Music venue in Omaha, Nebraska, United States

The Cog Factory, formerly located at 2224 Leavenworth Street in Omaha, Nebraska, was a 501(c)(3) non-profit organization that provided a punk rock music performance space for the area. The facility opened in 1994 with bands Ritual Device, Sideshow and Mousetrap. Musician Conor Oberst began making public performances there in the 1990s. Cog Factory closed permanently in January 2002.

== About ==
Serving as the foothold for the Omaha punk rock, hardcore, ska, and indie scene for many years, the Cog Factory was an all-ages venue located in Omaha's downtown core near the historic Old Market. Founded by self described "DIY-Punk" Robb Rathe, the Cog Factory served as the launching pad for the careers of many Saddle Creek Records bands, as well as being a tour stop for national acts. Cog Factory also promoted shows at Sokol Auditorium when the draw was too large for its own club.

== Structure ==
The Cog Factory was a non-profit 501(c)3 organization run strictly by volunteers. Proceeds from shows were used solely to cover the building expenses and payment of artists. Numerous volunteers tried keeping the club going until 2002, when Cog Factory ceased to operate. With all the original founding volunteers no longer operating Cog Factory after 2001, its original goal of providing an all-ages venue for every type of independent music free of discrimination started to erode. The club's organizational structure broke down, sufficient funds were no longer being earned, and the location was closed.

== Legacy ==
Footage of the venue is shown in the Spend an Evening with Saddle Creek documentary.

== Notable performers ==
- Acid Bath
- AFI
- Against All Authority
- All Out War
- American Nightmare
- Archers of Loaf
- The Ataris
- Avail
- Bane
- Bleeding Through
- Bogdan Raczynski
- Boris the Sprinkler
- BoySetsFire
- Brainiac
- Bright Eyes
- Buck-O-Nine
- Buried Alive
- Cap'n Jazz
- Catch 22
- Cave In
- Clayface
- Coalesce
- Commander Venus
- Converge
- C'mon Jack
- Cows
- Crash Worship
- Cursive
- Darkest Hour
- Dillinger Four
- The Dillinger Escape Plan
- Disembodied
- The Donnas
- D.R.I.
- Dropkick Murphys
- Earth Crisis
- Eighteen Visions
- Ensign
- Every Time I Die
- Fast Orange
- Fischer
- Frontier Trust
- The Faint
- The Gadjits
- Gas Huffer
- Good Riddance
- Grade
- Groovie Ghoulies
- Guttermouth
- H_{2}O
- Hammerhead
- Hatebreed
- The Haunted
- Indecision
- Isis (band)
- Jawbox
- The Jesus Lizard
- Jimmy Skaffa
- Jive Monkeys
- Joan Of Arc
- The Juliana Theory
- Karate
- Kid Dynamite
- The Lawrence Arms
- Leatherface
- The Lucky Ones
- Man or Astro-man?
- Mercy Rule
- Midtown
- Milemarker
- The Mountain Goats
- Mousetrap
- Murphy's Law
- Mustard Plug
- MU330
- Neurosis
- Neva Dinova
- New Found Glory
- No Innocent Victim
- One King Down
- Overcast
- Pageninetynine
- Park Ave.
- Poison the Well
- Propaghandi
- Q and Not U
- ramon speed
- Rancid
- Red Menace
- REVILO
- Rocket Fuel Is The Key
- ROW8P30
- Rye Coalition
- Saetia
- Season To Risk
- Skankin' Pickle
- Skavoovie and the Epitones
- Slowdown Virginia
- Small Brown Bike
- Smart Went Crazy
- Solid Jackson
- Sorry About Dresden
- Spoon
- SUPERTASTY
- The Suicide Machines
- Ten Yard Fight
- Texas Is The Reason
- Titanium White
- Today Is the Day
- Total Chaos
- Thrice
- Throwdown
- Tribe 8
- Twelve Tribes
- UK Subs
- Unearth
- Underoath
- Unsane
- Unwound
- Warzone
- Wesley Willis
- Witchery
- X-Cops
- Zao

== See also ==
- Music in Omaha
