= Duke Groner =

American jazz musician

Edward "Duke" Groner (March 24, 1908 – November 7, 1992) was an American jazz bassist and vocalist. Groner played the bass and piano and variously worked with Nat Towles, Jimmie Lunceford and Horace Henderson.

== Life and career ==
Groner was born in Ardmore, Oklahoma, United States, to a musical family, and began on violin as a child but quickly gave it up in favor of piano. He attended Wiley College, where he sang in college music organizations, then joined the band of Nat Towles upon graduation. He worked with Towles for several years before branching off with several of Towles's other sidemen to play in New York City with Horace Henderson at the Apollo Theater and the Savoy Ballroom; after the engagements were up, Henderson promptly fired the entire ensemble. Unlike most of Henderson's band, Groner sought to avoid being rehired by Towles, and remained in New York to become one of the house singers at Minton's Playhouse; Betty Roche was the other. This allowed him to work alongside Kenny Clarke and Thelonious Monk in the Minton's house band.

He then found a job in Jimmie Lunceford's band for a few months before returning to Chicago, where he joined Horace Henderson's new ensemble. When most of Henderson's ensemble, aside from Groner, was drafted, Groner worked in Chicago with Buster Bennett, Wild Bill Davis, and Jelly Holt and His Four Blazers. By 1942 he had started playing upright bass in addition to singing, working toward the end of the decade with Horace Palm and Emmett Spicer in a trio, which made recordings for the Aristocrat label in Chicago, which morphed into Chess Records after 1950. In the 1950s he played with Kirk Stuart, Hurley Ramey, Wallace Burton, and Jim Beebe.

Groner became ill gradually in his later years, and spent the end of his life in a nursing home. He died in Chicago in November 1992.
