= Henry B. Neef House =

Historic house in Nebraska, United States

- U.S. National Register of Historic Places
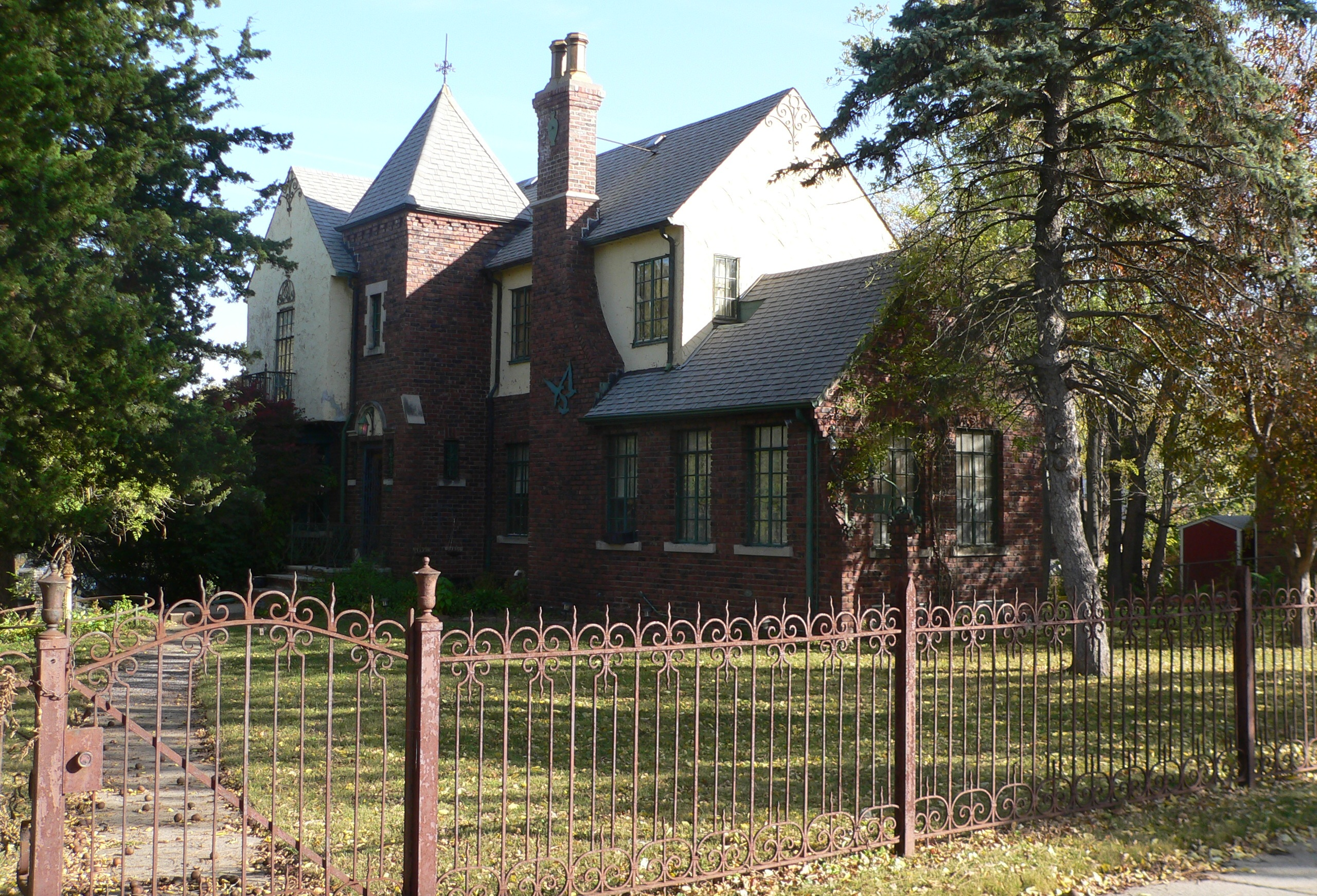
- View from Iowa Street to the southwest

- Location within Nebraska
- Location: 2884 Iowa St, Omaha, Nebraska
- Coordinates: 41°19′28.72″N 95°57′21.24″W
- Area: less than 1 acre (0.40 ha)
- NRHP reference No.: 10000758
- Added to NRHP: September 16, 2010

The Henry B. Neef House is located just north of the Minne Lusa neighborhood of North Omaha, Nebraska, United States. The Neef House was the first steel-frame house in the area, and was a pioneering construction style in Nebraska.

It was built in 1929 by Henry Neef.

The building was listed on the U.S. National Register of Historic Places on September 16, 2010. The listing was announced as the featured listing in the National Park Service's weekly list of September 24, 2010.
