= Fred Beckett =

American musician

Fred Lee Beckett (January 23, 1917 – January 30, 1946) was an American jazz trombonist known for his work with the Lionel Hampton Big Band and other jazz groups.

Beckett was born in 1917 in Nettleton, Mississippi and learned to play trombone in his high school band.

== Career ==
Beckett's professional career began in Kansas City in the 1930s, and soon after he landed a job with Eddie Johnson's Crackerjacks in St. Louis, Missouri. He played with Duke Wright, Tommy Douglas, Buster Smith, and Andy Kirk over the next few years, as well as time in a territory band with Prince Stewart and a gig in Omaha, Nebraska with Nat Towles. Later in the decade he played with Harlan Leonard. Beckett's musical style has been described as flexible and legato.

In the early 1940s, Beckett played with Lionel Hampton, performing behind vocalists like Dinah Washington. He served in the Army during World War II, where he contracted tuberculosis. He died of the illness in 1946 at the age of 28.
