= Jewell Building =

- U.S. National Register of Historic Places
- Omaha Landmark
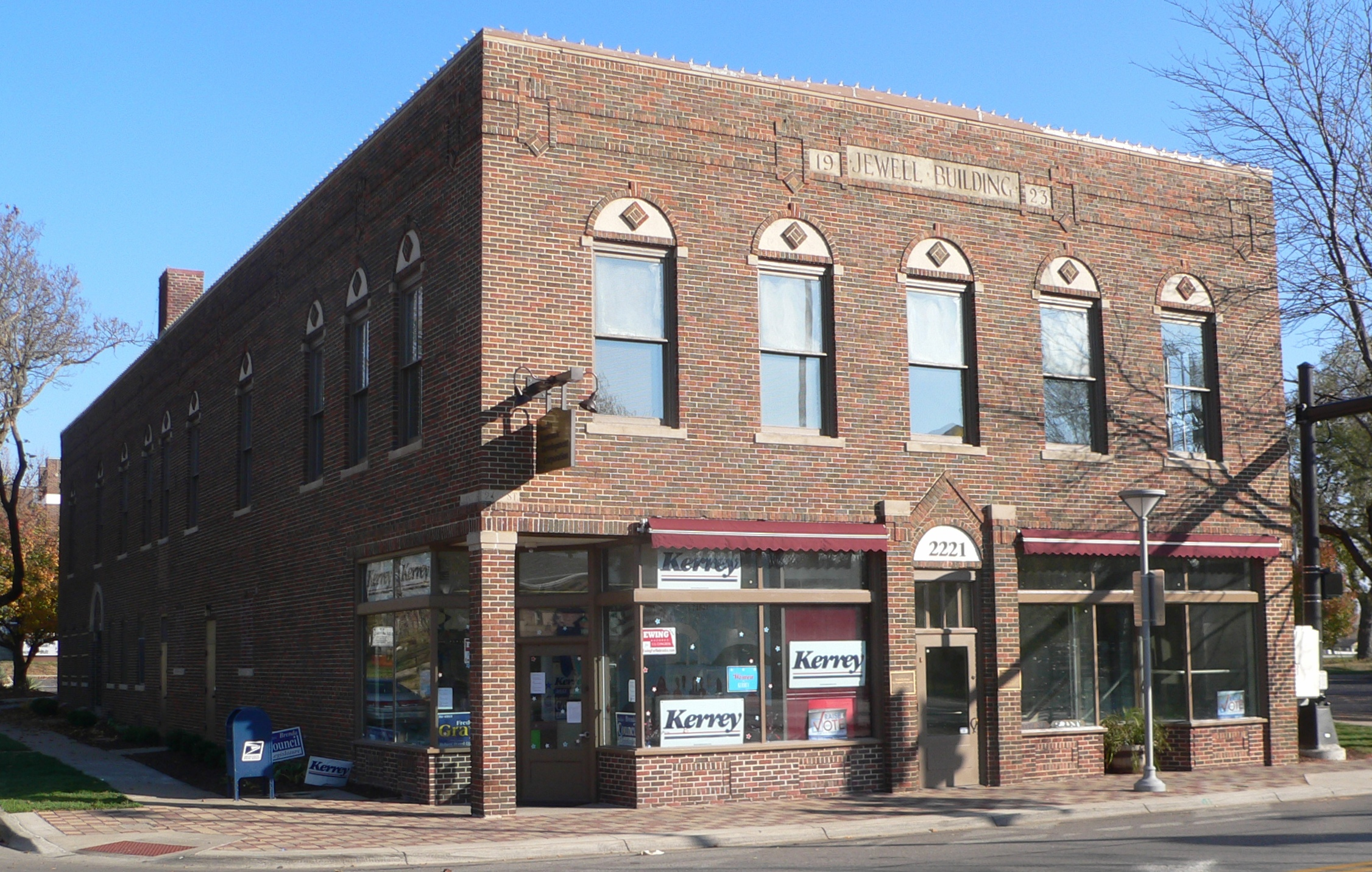

- Location within Nebraska
- Location: Omaha, NE
- Coordinates: 41°16′46.56″N 95°56′48.59″W
- Built: 1923
- Built by: Lof, John & Sons, Builder
- Architect: Henninger, F.A.
- Architectural style: Colonial Revival
- NRHP reference No.: 83001091

Significant dates
- Added to NRHP: July 21, 1983
- Designated OMAL: September 9, 1980

The Jewell Building is a city landmark in North Omaha, Nebraska. Built in 1923, it is listed on the National Register of Historic Places. Located at 2221 North 24th Street, the building was home to the Dreamland Ballroom for more than 40 years, and featured performances by many touring jazz and blues legends, including Duke Ellington, Count Basie, Louis Armstrong, Dizzy Gillespie, and Lionel Hampton.

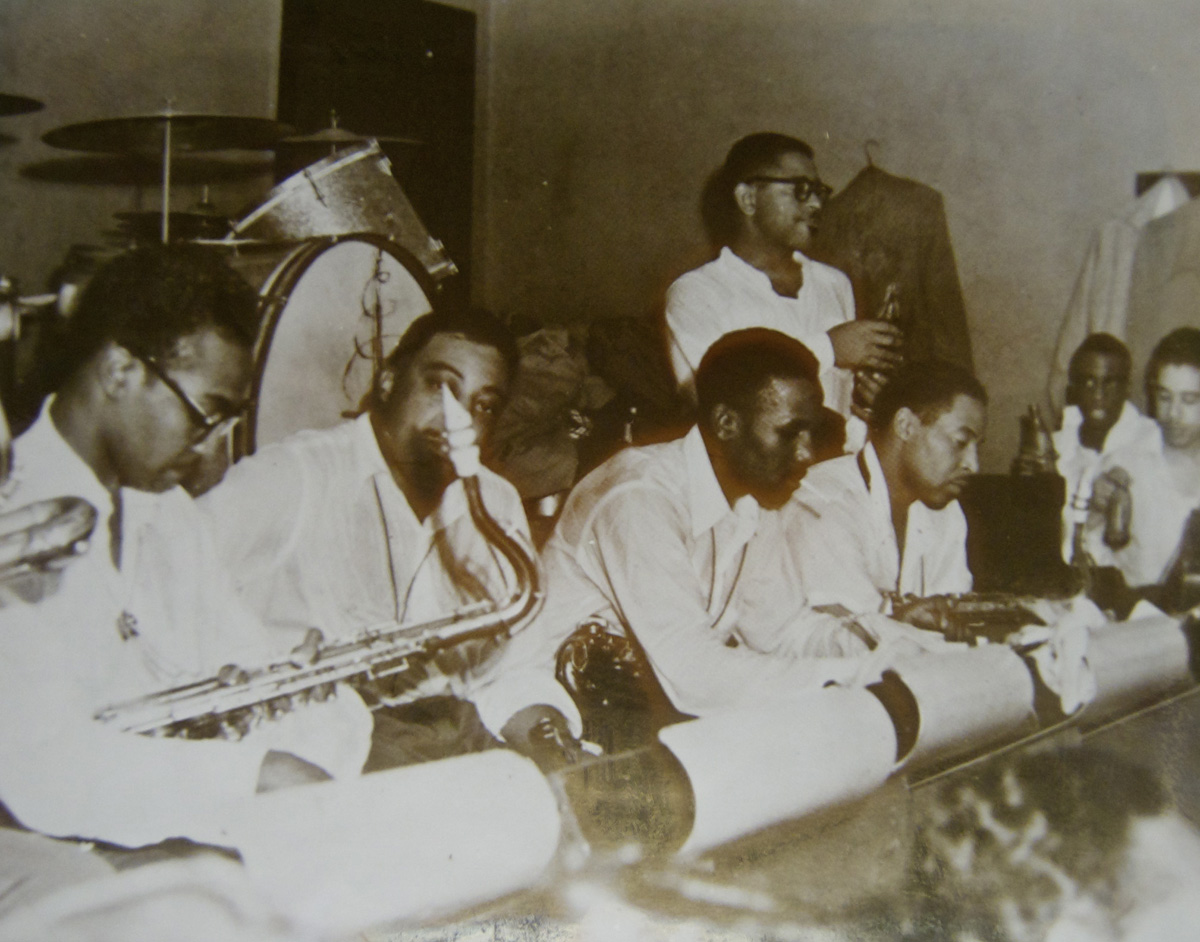
Dizzy Gillespie and his band at the Dreamland Ballroom in 1948

The building has been designated as a Landmark by the City of Omaha, and is listed on the National Register of Historic Places. It is an example of the kind of venue that was integral to the cultural transmission and interchange of musical styles and art, especially in the years before television. In addition such entertainment centers were the chief ways that musicians, both local and national, earned enough to make livings.

== About ==
Located at 2221-2225 North 24th Street in the Near North Side neighborhood of Omaha, the Jewell Building was built in 1923 by James Jewell Sr., an influential man in the local African-American community. Architect Frederick A. Henninger designed the building in the vernacular Georgian Revival style. It originally featured commercial spaces on the first floor, as well as the Dreamland Ballroom on the second floor.

In 1945 Dreamland Ballroom was used as a USO center for African-American soldiers. It continued to be used for music performances until 1965.

The Omaha Economic Development Council (OEDC) restored the building in the early 1980s. It was designated as a landmark by the City of Omaha on September 9, 1980, and was listed on the National Register of Historic Places in 1983. For several years, the Jewell Building housed OEDC's corporate headquarters and served as an office center for professional people and small businesses. Two private apartments were kept in the building.

== Dreamland Ballroom ==
Located on the second floor of the Jewell Building, the Dreamland Ballroom was the premier nightclub for big bands and jazz in Omaha. James Jewell Jr. booked the original Nat King Cole Trio for $25 a person for one show. Other performers included Dinah Washington, Earl Hines, Duke Ellington, Count Basie, Louis Armstrong, Dizzy Gillespie, and Lionel Hampton. A variety of Omaha music legends including Preston Love, Anna Mae Winburn and Lloyd Hunter also played at the Dreamland. The ballroom closed in the 1960s.

James Jewell was an influential man in the black community, and he invited activist Whitney Young to speak in the 1950s at Dreamland Hall about the Civil Rights Movement. Young started in Omaha and became the national director of the Urban League.

== See also ==
- Culture in North Omaha, Nebraska
- List of jazz clubs
- Music in Omaha
