= Sarah Benck =

American singer

Sarah Benck Tardy (born Sarah Louise Benck; 28 March 1984) is a musician from Omaha, Nebraska, and a visible figure in the Omaha indie rock scene. She is a singer-songwriter and plays the guitar and harmonica. Together with The Robbers she has recorded two albums: Suicide Doublewide (2005) and Neighbor's Garden (2007).

== Awards and accolades ==
She was awarded "Best contemporary singer" at the 2006 Omaha Entertainment and Arts Awards and "Best Adult Alternative" with the Robbers in 2007. That year they were also nominated for "Best blues", "Artist of the year", and "Local album of the year" (for Neighbor's Garden).

== See also ==
- Indie rock
