= Native Omaha Days =

Native Omahan Days is a bi-ennial event in North Omaha, Nebraska celebrating the community's historical and cultural legacies. Held since 1976, the Native Omaha Days include picnics, family reunions, class reunions and a large parade. The event is largely attended by current and former African American residents of the city.

== History ==
On October 24, 1976 a group called the Omaha Homecoming Planning Committee had their first meeting and a vision of having a reunion of native Omahans that left the city for various reasons. The individuals responsible for setting up the committee and subsequent meetings were founders, Vera Johnson and Bettie McDonald. On December 13, 1976, the committee elected to call themselves the Native Omahans Club. With a basic itinerary of a social mixer, gospel night, riverboat ride, homecoming parade, homecoming dance, picnic and a "Blue Monday", the Native Omahan's Club held their first homecoming on August 26, 1977. The week-long homecoming celebration reunites former residents to a city that they once called home.

== About ==
Native Omaha Days is celebrated as a "warm, communal homecoming... [that] expresses the deep ties that bind the city’s African-American community", Native Omaha Days are, "a time when natives long moved away return to roll with family and friends." Marked by a formal week and informal month of traditional community and family reunions and various activities, Native Omaha Days has been celebrated for more than 40 years.

People come from across the United States to participate in the events. According to one source, "It started out with about 10 people and it grew. We’ve had as many as 20,000 attend." A number of other local organizations, including the Urban League of Nebraska, sponsor activities during the Native Omahans Club Homecoming week including a golf tournament. Although these activities are not a part of the "official" activities, they have been welcomed by the Native Omahans Club and attendees in previous years.

The Evergreen Family Reunion, named after the rural Evergreen, Alabama, where more than 10 large North Omaha families originally migrated from is also held during this time. One man born in Evergreen and raised in Omaha says the families were forced to leave. "Most of us came here because we had to. A lot of my relatives had to leave the South in the middle of the night. I was little, but I did see some of the things we were confronted with, like the Ku Klux Klan". Actress Gabrielle Union's family was among those families, and she attends Omaha Days festivities annually, along with professional football player Gale Sayers, and Radio One founder and owner Cathy Hughes.

Another mainstay of Native Omaha Days is the Native Omaha Parade, with dozens of floats, marching bands, and politicians, as well as many youth programs and organizations.

Native Omaha Days has been cited nationally as an example of a strong community building activity for African Americans, with many other cities seeking to replicate the event.

The Native Omahans Club, where events are planned and held, is located at 3819 North 24th Street.

== See also ==
- Culture in North Omaha, Nebraska
- History of North Omaha, Nebraska
