= Elmer Crumbley =

American jazz musician

Elmer Crumbly
- Born: August 1, 1908; Kingfisher, Oklahoma, U.S.
- Died: September 17, 1993 (aged 85) Brooklyn, New York, U.S.
- Genres: Jazz
- Instruments: Trombone

Elmer Crumbley (August 1, 1908 – September 17, 1993) was an American trombonist.

== Early life ==
Born in Kingfisher, Oklahoma, Crumbley was raised in Denver and Omaha, Nebraska.

== Career ==
Crumbley performed with Cab Calloway and Earl Hines in the 1960s and 1970s.

He joined the Dandie Dixie Minstrels in 1926 with bandleader Lloyd Hunter. He played with the George E. Lee Band, western swing pioneer Tommy Douglas, and Bill Owens. But he continued to work with Hunter as well as players such as Jabbo Smith and Erskine Tate. Crumbley founded his own ensemble in Omaha in 1934, and joined up with the Jimmie Lunceford Band the same year. He also played with Eddie Wilcox, Lucky Millinder, and Erskine Hawkins. He toured Europe in the late 1950s with Sammy Price, a period when he also became part of the scene at the Apollo in Harlem with a lively combo led by Reuben Phillips.
