= Omaha Blues, Jazz, & Gospel Festival =

Music festival in Nebraska, US

- Genre: Blues,
- Founders: Terry O'Halloran
- Website: Omaha Blues, Jazz, & Gospel Festival

The Omaha Blues, Jazz, & Gospel Festival is an annual event of blues, jazz and gospel music that has been held at Rosenblatt Stadium in South Omaha and Fort Omaha in North Omaha, Nebraska in August.

Founded by Terry O'Halloran, a local blues bar establishment owner, the festival has included a variety of performers, including Kelley Hunt, Lois "Lady Mac" McMorris, Everette Harp, Preston Love and Lil' Brian and the Zydeco Travelers.

== See also ==
- List of blues festivals
- Culture in Omaha, Nebraska
- List of jazz festivals
