= Minne Lusa =

- Minne Lusa Residential Historic District
- U.S. National Register of Historic Places
- U.S. Historic district
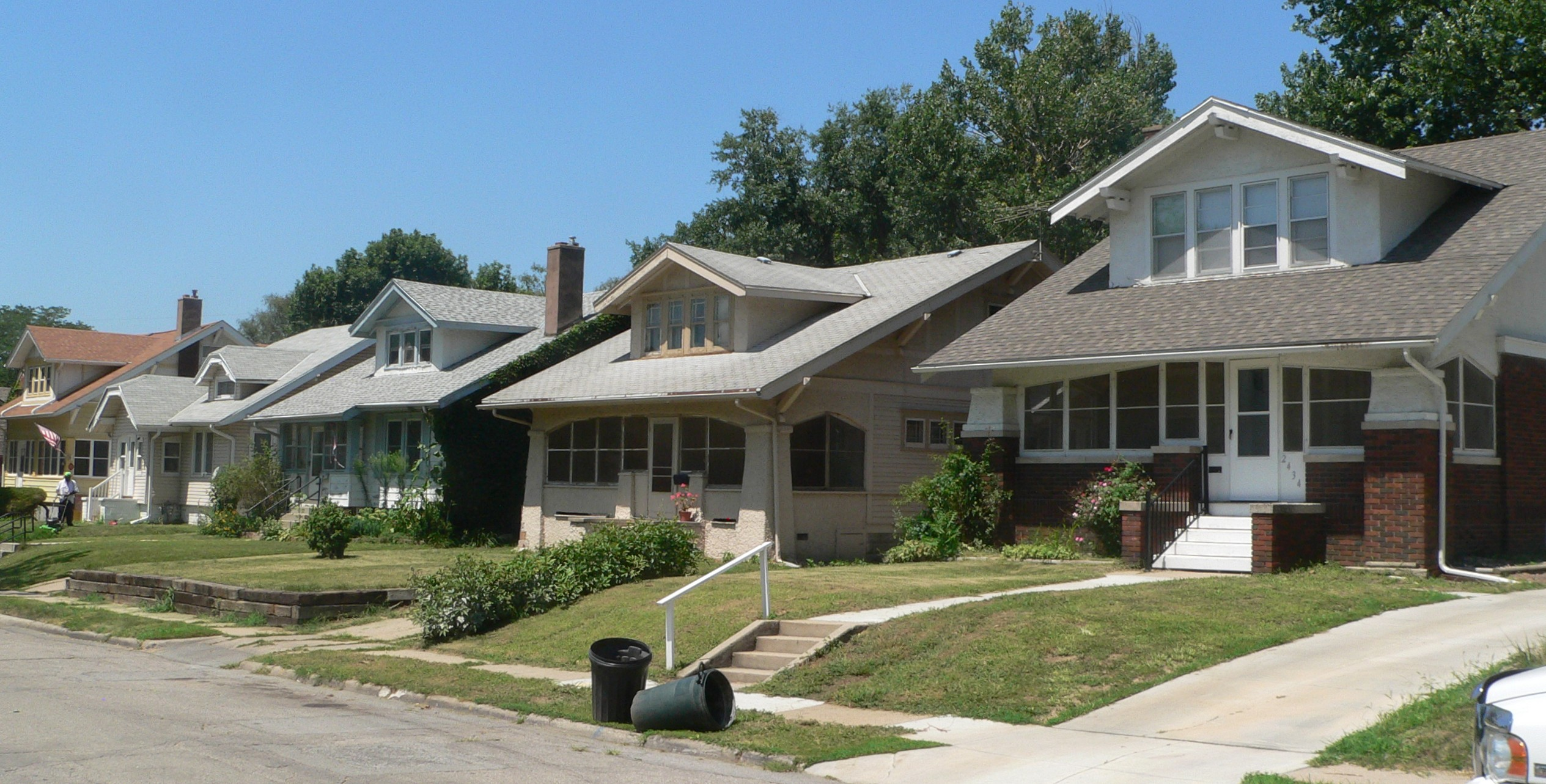
- Houses on Bauman Avenue

- Location within Nebraska Location within the United States
- Location: Omaha, Nebraska
- Coordinates: 41°19′16″N 95°57′07″W
- Architect: Everett Dodd
- Architectural style: Late 19th And 20th Century Revivals, Late 19th And Early 20th Century American Movements
- NRHP reference No.: 14000178
- Added to NRHP: April 25, 2014

The Minne Lusa Residential Historic District is located in North Omaha, Nebraska. It is included on the National Register of Historic Places. According to the National Park Service, it is an "example of a substantial, affordable single-family residential development within the city limits that was platted, developed and constructed by a single firm between 1915 and 1941." The neighborhood is filled with bungalows, Craftsman, and other styles that were popular in the era. There are 540 properties in the neighborhood that contribute to the historic district, the other 167 do not. Minne Lusa Boulevard is a contributing structure.

The district's boundaries are Vane Street on the north and Redick Avenue on the south; North 24th Street on the east and North 30th Street on the west. It is located just north of the Miller Park neighborhood, and just south of Florence and includes all of the area originally known as the Minne Lusa Addition.

== History ==
According to the Omaha Public Library, "Minne Lusa" comes from a Native American word of unknown origins that means "clear water". The Minne Lusa Pumping Station was built at the Florence Water Works north of the area in 1899. Presumably the neighborhood, established 17 years later, took its name from that.

The Minne Lusa neighborhood was first platted by Charles Martin in 1916, and by 1923 was a completed development. Southeast of the newly annexed community of Florence, Minne Lusa was touted as the "largest addition ever platted in Omaha." It included 800 lots on 33 blocks. Lot prices ranged from $450 to $1,000. Minne Lusa Boulevard bisected the subdivision and meandered north from Miller Park. Most homes reflected craftsman bungalow and period revival architectural styles. In general, larger homes were constructed on lots fronting Minne Lusa Boulevard while more modest homes were constructed along cross streets.

One of the primary designers of the development was Everett S. Dodds, a prominent Omaha architect.

Minne Lusa grew at about the same time that automobiles were becoming affordable in the middle class. Nearly every original home in the neighborhood was built with a garage or had one added soon after. The first steel-frame house in the area, on Iowa Street just north of the district, was built by Henry Neef. That house, the Henry B. Neef House, was listed on the U.S. National Register of Historic Places in September 2010.

== Notable buildings not contributing ==
Several buildings are located within the geographic boundaries of the district but not considered as contributing to the historic district due to their significant alterations. The original Minne Lusa School was opened as Fort School in 1916. It was moved and rebuilt, opening in 1924 in its current location. The school was updated in 1955, and completed another renovation in 1997.

Another local landmark called the Viking Ship is, according to a local neighborhood group, "a building of distinctive architecture at the corner of Minne Lusa Boulevard and Redick Avenue... [it has] been known at different times as the Prettiest Mile Club, Hayden House, and the Birchwood Club." The Hayden House eventually took turns moving from the Viking Ship to Eppley Airfield, and was to the Union Station in downtown Omaha. Today it is a fully restored art deco icon that sits in the Durham Western Heritage Museum.

The area is home to the former Minne Lusa Theater, a one-screen neighborhood movie house that opened in the mid-1930s along North 30th Street. It seated 400. The theater closed sometime in the mid 50s.

=== Minne Lusa Water Works ===
The Metropolitan Utilities District operates a huge system at the Florence Water Works to filter Missouri River water. The Minne Lusa Pumping Station, demolished by the city in the 1960s, was a massive building of Warrensburg sandstone with a central tower rising four stories over an arched entrance. Designed by Omaha architects, it was built in 1889 in a classical style reflecting the influence of the 1898 Trans-Mississippi Exposition. This building contained the high service pump and boilers, and sent the filtered water to city water mains for the entire city of Omaha.

== See also ==
- History of Omaha
