= Sherry Drive =

American hard rock band

- Origin: Nebraska, United States
- Genres: Hard rock; alternative rock; post-hardcore
- Years active: 2012–present
- Label: Independent
- Members: Anu Ratzburg; Jeremey Meyer; Richard Ratzburg; Cory Drennan; Darin Schmelzer
- Past members: Rusty Perry; Soren Passey
- Website: www.sherrydrive.com

Sherry Drive is an American hard rock band that formed in Bellevue, Nebraska in 2012. Their first album, One Lane Bridge, was released in April, 2014. Their second album Fly was released in August, 2016.

== History ==
=== Formation, tours & accomplishments (2012–2016) ===
Sherry Drive has performed on the 2014 & 2015 Project Independent World Tour, played numerous live shows, and has released two studio albums. Sherry Drive has played shows with many bands over the years including Skid Row and Sick Puppies

They have achieved a #1 ranking for the Omaha area 2014-2016 on Reverb Nation. Sherry Drive has been ranked as high as #13 on The Indie website. The band members all have military backgrounds or affiliation.

== Band members ==
Current members

- Anu Ratzburg – lead guitar, backing vocals (2012–present)
- Jeremey Meyer – bass, backing vocals (2012–present)
- Darin Schmelzer – drums, percussion (2012–present)
- Richard Ratzburg – rhythm guitar (2012–present)
- Cory Drennan - keyboards, piano (2015–present)

Former members

- Rusty Perry – lead vocals (2012–2016)
- Soren Passey – drums, percussion (2015)

Timeline

== Discography ==
- One Lane Bridge EP (2013)
- Checkmate | single (2016)
- This Far | single (2016)
- Fly (2016)
