= Anna Mae Winburn =

American vocalist and jazz bandleader (1913–1999)

- Winburn and William D. Alexander in the 1940s

Background information
- Born: Anna Mae Darden; August 13, 1913; Port Royal, Tennessee, U.S.
- Died: September 30, 1999 (aged 86) Hempstead, New York, U.S.
- Genres: Jazz, big band
- Occupations: Singer, bandleader
- Instruments: Vocals, guitar
- Years active: 1936–1956

Anna Mae Winburn (née Darden; August 13, 1913 – September 30, 1999) was an American vocalist and jazz bandleader who flourished beginning in the mid-1930s. An African-American, she is best known for having directed the International Sweethearts of Rhythm, an all-female big band that was perhaps one of the few – and one of the most – racially integrated dance-bands of the swing era. In 1944, the band was named as the country's favorite all-female orchestra in a DownBeat magazine poll.

== Early life ==
Anna Mae Darden was born in Port Royal, Tennessee, to Andrew Jackson Darden (1881–1956) and Lula Carnell (maiden; 1882–1929), a musical family. Her family moved to Kokomo, Indiana, when she was young.

She was the fourth oldest of nine siblings, with five brothers and three sisters. All three of her sisters also became performers. Winburn never finished high school but turned to music as a way to help support her large family after her mother had died.

== Career ==
=== Midwestern United States ===
Winburn's musical career began when she entered a talent contest at the Isis Theater in Kokomo, Indiana, placing second after singing the Ethel Waters song "Lovey Joe" and accompanying herself on guitar. Her first known publicized performance was singing with the white studio band of Radio WOWO in Fort Wayne. In the early years of her career, she also spent some time in Chicago, singing and playing guitar in the penthouse of the Grand Terrace Ballroom at the same time that Earl Hines was performing downstairs.

She worked at various clubs in Indiana, including the Chateau Lido in Indianapolis, where she appeared under the pseudonym Anita Door. Winburn adopted the stage name so she could pass as Spanish, despite not knowing the language, in order to get more work than she could if club owners and customers knew she was African-American.

From there she moved to Omaha, Nebraska, where she sang and played guitar for a variety of territory bands, or groups whose touring activities and popularity were geographically limited to several adjoining states. Red Perkins hired her as a vocalist for his band. From 1936 to 1937, Winburn was a collaborator of Lloyd Hunter, frequently singing for Hunter's "Serenaders". In 1938, she took the reins of the Oklahoma-based Kansas City Blue Devils, and she toured with them into 1939 as Anna Mae Winburn and the Cotton Club Boys; this group at one point included the guitarist Charlie Christian.

At a time when many American male musicians were lost to the World War II draft, in late 1941, Winburn was hired to join the International Sweethearts of Rhythm.

=== International Sweethearts of Rhythm ===
Eddie Durham had been the composer for the International Sweethearts of Rhythm for two years before leaving to create Eddie Durham's All-Star Girl Orchestra. After being recommended by Jimmie Jewel, who owned North Omaha's Dreamland Ballroom, Winburn became the leader of the band in late 1941. She was reportedly hired for her attractive figure, with the intention of doing little actual composing or singing, but within a short time after joining the band, she was not only singing but also fronting the group.

In the 1986 documentary film International Sweethearts of Rhythm, Winburn reported of her first meeting, "I said 'What a bunch of cute little girls, but I don't know whether I could get along with that many women or not.' "

The Sweethearts were immensely popular from 1940 through 1946. They had a breakout performance at Harlem's Apollo Theater in 1941, and later that year played the Savoy Ballroom. In 1942, the band toured the United States twice, performing from coast to coast primarily for African-American audiences. They participated in multiple "battle of the sexes" concerts with other prominent big bands of the time, including those of Fletcher Henderson, Erskine Hawkins and Jimmy Dorsey. They broke attendance records at the Chicago Regal Theater that previously had been set by Count Basie and Louis Armstrong. In 1944 and 1945, they were featured several times on Armed Forces Radio, which led to requests from black soldiers for the Sweethearts to be included in USO tours. Starting in July 1945, the group spent six months performing in post-war France and Germany and was one of the most popular USO acts.

Despite rumors of Mildred McIver being groomed to take her place, Winburn was the leader of the band until she left to get married in mid-1948. The group disbanded in 1949.

Winburn formed other incarnations of the International Sweethearts for the next several years, often billing her name before the band's. While those bands were successful, they did not regain the level of popularity from the earlier years.

Anna Mae Winburn and Her Sweethearts performed at the eighth Cavalcade of Jazz concert held at Wrigley Field in Los Angeles on June 1, 1952. The concert was produced by Leon Hefflin Sr. and other featured artists were Jerry Wallace, Toni Harper, Roy Brown and His Mighty Men, Louis Jordan, Jimmy Witherspoon, and Josephine Baker.

In 1953, Winburn re-formed the group as an octet, and later tried to restart the big band. By 1956, the last version of the Sweethearts had disbanded, marking the end of Winburn's musical career.

== Personal life ==
On January 2, 1930, Anna Mae Darden married Charles Raymond Winburn (1910–1960) in Howard County, Indiana. In 1947, she was granted a divorce by the Howard County Circuit Court in Kokomo. In the divorce proceedings, she testified that Charles abandoned her in June 1934.

In 1948, Winburn married "Duke" Pilgrim (né Eustace Michael Pilgrim; 1921–1970). They had four children between 1948 and 1956. The family lived in Elmhurst, New York.

=== Death ===
Winburn died on September 30, 1999, in Hempstead, New York.
