= Lloyd Hunter =

American trumpeter and bandleader (1910–1961)

- Born: Lloyd Hunter; May 4, 1910
- Died: April 18, 1961 (aged 50)
- Genres: Jazz music Big band
- Occupation: Bandleader
- Instrument: Trumpet
- Years active: 1921–1961
- Label: Vocalion Records

Lloyd Hunter (May 4, 1910 – April 18, 1961) was an American trumpeter and big band leader from North Omaha, Nebraska.

== Biography ==
Hunter was trained by Josiah Waddle, the first African-American musician to organize a band in Omaha, around 1915. Hunter's bands played regionally, filling high school auditoriums, jitney ("Dime-a-Dance") halls, farm buildings and amusement parks throughout Nebraska, Iowa, Kansas and South Dakota from the 1920s through the 1950s.

== Lloyd Hunter's Serenaders ==
Lloyd Hunter's Serenaders were one of several black territory bands that played venues in the African American community of the Near North Side of Omaha from the early 1920s through the big band era.

In 1924, Hunter formed his first six-piece band. In 1927 it became an 8-piece band with Lloyd Hunter on trumpet, Elmer Crumbley on trombone, Noble Floyd on clarinet and alto sax, Bob Welch on trombone, tenor saxophone and bass sax; Burton Brewer on piano; Julius Alexander on banjo; Wallace Wright on tuba, and; Amos Clayton on drums. As was usual, the band toured the area playing one night stands. By 1929, the band was heard on radio stations KGBZ in York, Nebraska; KFAB in Lincoln, Nebraska; and WOW in Omaha.

He recorded only once, near the beginning of a ten-month national tour with then prominent blues singer Victoria Spivey. The record, Sensational Mood, included Lloyd Hunter, Reuben Floyd, and George Lott or Ted Frank on trumpets; Elmer Crumbley or Joe Edwards on trombone; Horace "Noble" Floyd and Archie Watts on alto saxophones; Harold Arnold or Dick Lewis on tenor saxophone; George Madison, piano; Herbert Hannah, banjo; Robert Welch or Wallace Wright, bass, and Pete Woods or Jo Jones on drums. It was recorded April 21, 1931, in New York. Originally issued on Vocalion 1621 (The other side was a Victoria Spivey blues vocal with the band providing accompaniment.)

The 12-piece band undertook a national tour that featured Spivey, who was married to Hunter's second trumpet Rueben Floyd at the time. The tour was less than successful, and by 1932 Hunter was back in Omaha, which would be his home base for the next 10 years.

The saxophonist Preston Love got his start with Lloyd Hunter in the early 1940s, as well as Johnny Otis on drums. While describing North Omaha's music scene, Love once suggested that Hunter relied on that community's talent for his own success. Anna Mae Winburn was an early collaborator with Hunter.

Nat Towles' band once out-played The Serenaders to make their own name in Omaha's music history. Hunter's band was also once the target of a "raid" by a major label attempting to construct their own version of Count Basie's band, which was also formed after one-such raid.

== Legacy ==
Lloyd Hunter was recognized for his contributions to the North Omaha scene in 2005 when he was inducted in the Omaha Black Music Hall of Fame.

== See also ==
- Culture in North Omaha, Nebraska
- Music in Omaha, Nebraska
