= Minne Lusa Theater =

- Interactive map of Minne Lusa Theater
- Address: 6714 North 30th Street; Omaha, Nebraska; USA
- Coordinates: 41°19′12″N 95°57′26″W
- Capacity: 400
- Type: Neighborhood theater

Construction
- Years active: 1929-1958

The Minne Lusa Theater building is located at 6714 North 30th Street in North Omaha, Nebraska. It was built as a one-screen neighborhood movie house that opened in 1929 with seating for approximately 400 patrons. The theater closed sometime in 1958. The building was renovated and housed Heartland Family Services for twenty years.
