= Preston Love =

American saxophonist, bandleader, and songwriter

- Born: Preston Haynes Love; 26 April 1921; Omaha, Nebraska, U.S.
- Died: 12 February 2004 (aged 82) Omaha, Nebraska, U.S.
- Genres: Jazz, rhythm and blues
- Occupations: Band leader, musician, songwriter
- Instrument: Alto saxophone
- Years active: 1936–2004
- Formerly of: Nat Towles, Lloyd Hunter, Snub Mosley, Lucky Millinder, Fats Waller, Count Basie Orchestra, Lena Horne, Johnny Otis, Wynonie Harris, Billie Holiday, Ray Charles, the Temptations, Smokey Robinson, Diana Ross, Stevie Wonder, Aretha Franklin

Preston Haynes Love (April 26, 1921 – February 12, 2004) was an American saxophonist, bandleader, and songwriter from Omaha, Nebraska, United States, best known as a sideman for jazz and rhythm and blues artists like Count Basie and Ray Charles.

== Biography ==
Preston Love grew up in North Omaha and graduated in 1938 from North High.

He became renowned as a professional sideman and saxophone balladeer in the heyday of the big band era. He was a member of the bands of Nat Towles, Lloyd Hunter, Snub Mosley, Lucky Millinder and Fats Waller before getting his big break with the Count Basie Orchestra when he was 22. Love played and recorded with the Count Basie band from 1945–1947, and played on Basie's only No. 1 hit record, "Open The Door Richard."

Love eventually became a bandleader himself, playing with Lena Horne, Billie Holiday, his friends Johnny Otis and Wynonie Harris, with whom he had several hits.

In 1952, he launched the short-lived Spin Records, as a joint effort with songwriter Otis René ("When It's Sleepy Time Down South"). The label released material by the Preston Love Orchestra, among others.

In the early 1960s, Love worked with Ray Charles in California, and Aretha Franklin, eventually becoming Motown's West Coast house bandleader, playing and touring with The Four Tops, The Temptations, Tammi Terrell, Marvin Gaye, Gladys Knight and others. Love also recorded with Nichelle Nichols, Janis Joplin, Frank Zappa (on Freak Out!), Shuggie Otis, T-Bone Walker, Charles Brown, Ruth Brown, and many others. Love also appears in the Clint Eastwood film Play Misty For Me with the Johnny Otis band. Love continued touring the U.S. and Europe into the 2000s, additionally lecturing and writing about the history he was part of. Other legends he played with included Smokey Robinson, Diana Ross, and Stevie Wonder.

In his later years Love moved back to Omaha, wrote a book, led bands, the last of which featured his daughter vocalist Portia Love, drummer Gary E. Foster, pianist Orville Johnson, and bassist Nate Mickels, and was an advertising agent for the Omaha Star, a local newspaper serving the city's African American community. He also is father of the singer, songwriter and bass player Laura Love.

In February 2004, Love died after battling prostate cancer.

His son, Preston Love Jr., is an activist and politician, who received the support of the Nebraska Democratic Party in the 2020 United States Senate election in Nebraska, to challenge Senator Ben Sasse.

== Awards and honors ==
- 1975 First jazz artist-in-residence for the Iowa Arts Council
- 1992 Received an honorary doctorate from Creighton University
- 1998 Inducted into the Nebraska Music Hall of Fame
- 2003 At age 82, he was recognized by the Omaha Press Club as part of their "Face on the Barroom Floor" series that honors notable newsmakers.
- 2005 The non-profit Loves Jazz and Arts Center was established.
- 2005 Inducted into the Omaha Black Music Hall of Fame

== Discography ==
=== As leader ===
- Preston Love's Omaha Bar-B-Q (Kent, 1970)
- Omaha Blues (Mexie L, 2001)
- Preston Love (Mexie L, 2003)

=== As sideman ===
With Count Basie

- The Count (RCA Camden, 1957)
- Basie's Basement (RCA Camden, 1959)
- 1947 Brand New Wagon (Bluebird, 1990)

With others

- Lucky Millinder with Sister Rosetta Tharpe, Lucky Days 1941–1945 (MCA, 1980)
- Shuggie Otis, Here Comes Shuggie Otis (Epic, 1970)
- Johnny Otis, The Johnny Otis Show Live at Monterey! (Epic, 1971)
- T-Bone Walker, Stormy Monday Blues (BluesWay, 1968)
- Frank Zappa, Freak Out! (Verve, 1966)

== Books by Love ==
- A Thousand Honey Creeks Later: My Life in Music from Basie to Motown and Beyond. Wesleyan University Press, Middletown CT, 1997.

== Other sources ==
- The Omaha Sunday World Herald: July 15, 1990, pp. F-1, F-3 and December 14, 1997, pp. E-1, E-8
- The New York Times, April 5, 1998, Sec. 2, p. 28
- The New Grove Dictionary of Jazz, Second ed, Vol 2 (2002) 628.
