= Primordial (roller coaster) =

Interactive dark ride roller coaster at Lagoon

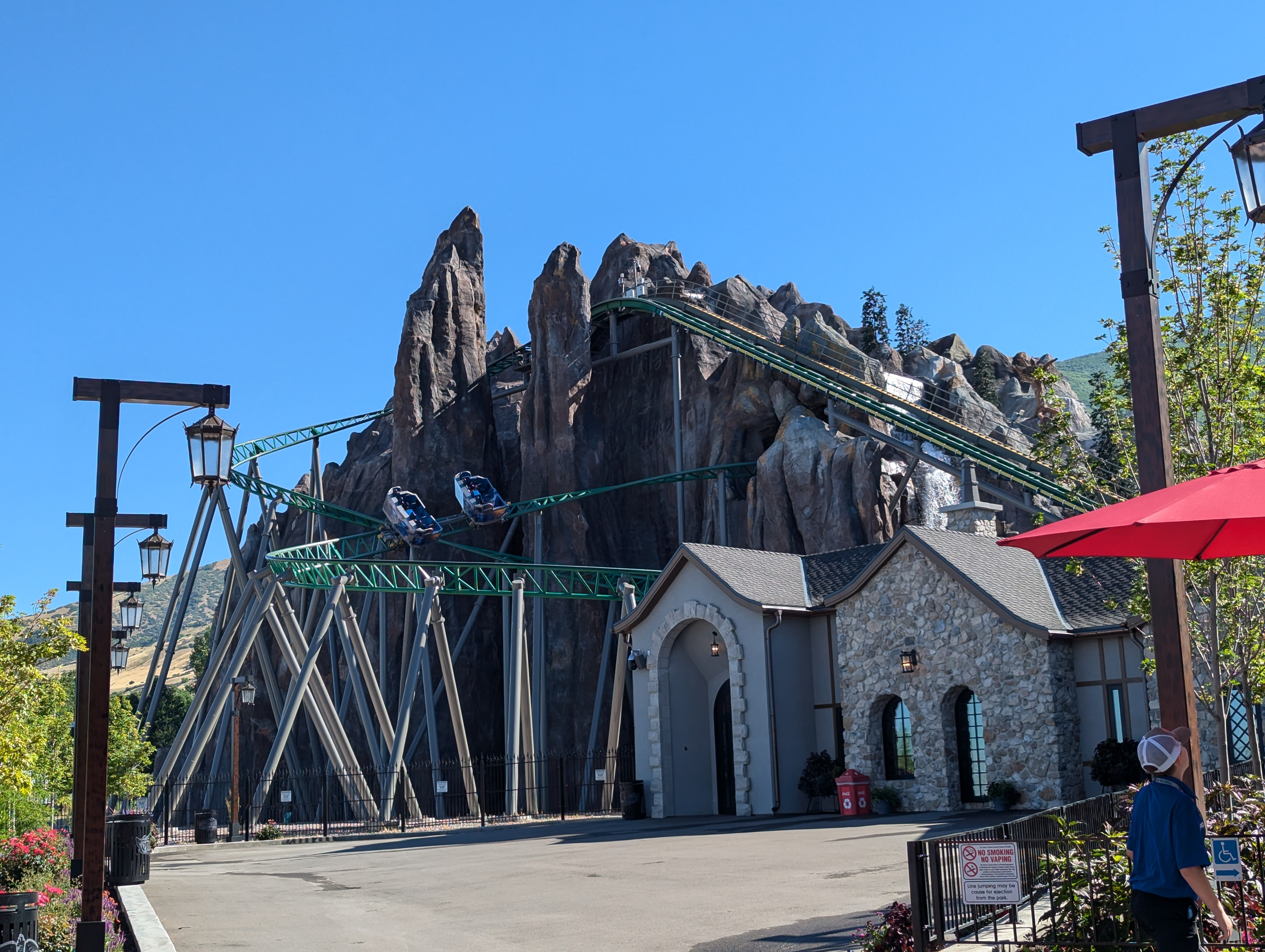

Lagoon
- Location: Lagoon
- Park section: North Midway
- Coordinates: 40.988704°N 111.892839°W
- Status: Operating
- Opening date: September 15, 2023

General statistics
- Type: Steel
- Manufacturer: ART Engineering
- Designer: Lagoon
- Model: 4D Interactive Dark Ride
- Lift/launch system: Chain lift hill
- Height: 85.3 ft (26.0 m)
- Length: 1,984.9 ft (605.0 m)
- Speed: 40.4 mph (65.0 km/h)
- Duration: < 5:00
- Capacity: ~900 riders per hour
- Height restriction: 36 in (91 cm)
- Trains: 10 trains with 2 cars. Riders are arranged 4 across in a single row for a total of 8 riders per train.
- Primordial at RCDB

Primordial is a 4D interactive dark ride roller coaster located at Lagoon Amusement Park in Farmington, Utah. Designed in-house by the park and various engineering teams, the coaster was developed and constructed over a period of eight years.

== History ==
=== Development ===
ART Engineering had assisted the park in the design of several roller coaster projects, including BomBora in 2011 and Cannibal in 2015. In 2014, the manufacturer supplied Wonder Mountain's Guardian to Canada's Wonderland in Vaughan, Ontario, an attraction that combined a roller coaster experience with an interactive dark ride. Intrigued by the concept, Lagoon officials began discussing the attraction's merits with ART Engineering, intending to add a similar ride to the park.

Development began after Cannibal opened in July 2015. Per their ongoing partnership with ART and previous experience working on Wonder Mountain's Guardian, Triotech supplied the media-based elements. Primordial was first trademarked to the United States Patent and Trademark Office in August 2017.

Lagoon aimed to create a family-friendly roller coaster, avoiding any sinister or menacing overtones. In addition, the park sought to abandon the cliché of chasing enemies. According to park director Julie Freed, "We didn’t want to shoot the bad guy... We wanted to be freeing the good guy.”

=== Construction ===
Work began to the north of the park in October 2018, occupying part of the employee parking lot. Over the following year, crews focused on pouring the concrete foundation, as well as constructing the central towers that would form the core of the artificial mountain which would house the drop track and slide track. The first track pieces began arriving from Intermountain Lift in 2019. Much of the outdoor descent and helix were set up in October 2022, while the ride's station and buildings outside of the mountain were constructed that winter. Primordial began making test laps in May 2023.

Lagoon lost a year of progress on the attraction due to the impact of the COVID-19 pandemic. Representatives also attributed the coaster's long delay to the novelty of the coaster's systems.

=== Opening ===
Lagoon officially announced in November 2022 that Primordial would be ready in the 2023 season. With only six weeks left in the season, Primordial officially opened on September 15, 2023. During the remainder of the season, Lagoon passholders were allowed to make reservations to experience Primordial on select afternoons.

== Ride experience ==
Primordial's storyline takes place in a fantastical kingdom whose day and night cycle is perpetuated by the mystical dragon Dragnor and owl Astradir. When evil forces capture and imprison the two creatures in the Dolomite Mountains, a lynx known as Queen Azdra implores riders to free them in order to restore peace to the realm. Guests are informed of the story through an animatronic of Queen Azdra, and supplied with 3D glasses for the ride.

Disengaging from the loading conveyor, riders make a 165° right hand turn and climb the chain lift hill past a waterfall to a peak height of 85.3 feet (26.0 m). The track leads into the main coaster section, with the train descending through a left-hand turnaround and an upwards clockwise helix. Entering the mountain, the train navigates another turnaround around the drop tower before entering the first gameplay section. The cars then rotate riders to face backwards during the next coaster section, consisting of an S-bend track leading down to the second level of gameplay.

During the next scene, the train is directed towards one of two physical endings; a drop track or a sliding track, both of which descend back to ground level. On the slide track, riders can be sent down facing either forwards or backwards. (Note: Direction is irrelevant on the drop track, riders only face the right side of the screen during the drop.) Regardless of which path they take, riders are presented with one of two final battle scenes; rescue either Dragnor or Astradir. With three physical endings and two finales, a total combination of six possible endings are available on Primordial. (Note: Park director Julie Freed, assuming that the drop track's different directions result in four endings, has attributed the total to eight. Nol van Genuchten of Triotech, however, has referred to the total as six.)

Upon returning to the loading zone, riders are met with their individual scores and one of eight farewell messages from Puntus and Ateka, the guard characters who make multiple appearances throughout the ride.

== Characteristics ==
=== Statistics ===
Primordial is 85.3 feet (26.0 m) tall, 1,985 feet (605 m) long, and reaches a top speed of 40.4 mph (65.0 km/h) throughout the ride. The coaster occupies a 229.7-by-328.1 ft site and sits within a 750,000-square-foot artificial mountain, a footprint 30% larger than that of Cannibal. Over 5,000 square feet of projection screens are used to display the eight interactive scenes.

=== Trains ===
Although Lagoon owns ten trains for the coaster, Primordial can operate with nine eight-passenger trains, each of which contains two cars seating four riders in a single row. A joint design between Lagoon and ART, riders board from the front of the car by means of a continuously moving conveyor belt. The cars are able to rotate in order to interact with show scenes, coaster segments, and the station platform.

Each rider's restraint is equipped with a blaster gun, allowing them to engage with gameplay and shoot at targets for points. Triotech engineered a new type of blaster to handle the sudden movements of the coaster, so the gun would have a flexible range of motion without being a safety hazard to its riders.

=== Contractors ===
Lagoon worked with more than 50 Utah contractors and suppliers, who contributed to at least 75% of the project. Overall, 65 vendors were involved in the making of Primordial. While Lagoon designed the coaster in-house, ART Engineering was also the primary manufacturer of the ride's hardware. The entire attraction was fabricated in Utah, with the track produced by Intermountain Lift and support columns provided by Petersen, Inc. Triotech delivered the ride's interactive media, screen-based components, audio, and theming elements, as well as supplying the Queen Azdra lynx animatronic.

In addition, a wide variety of vendors contributed to various technical aspects of Primordial, including;

- Actemium: Supplied the attraction's electrical hardware and control system, including cart rotation.
- Cemrock Landscapes: Aided in designing the artificial mountain.
- LocketGo: Provided double-sided lockers to store loose articles before the ride.
- Stengel: Responsible for engineering and fabrication drawings of the coaster hardware.
- Themrise: Manufactured its thematic elements and set pieces.
