= Lagoon (amusement park) =

Amusement park in Farmington, Utah

- Previously known as Lake Park (1886–1906)
- Interactive map of Lagoon
- Location: Farmington, Utah, United States
- Coordinates: 40°59′08″N 111°53′41″W
- Opened: 1886
- Owner: Lagoon Corporation
- Slogan: "It's what fun is!"
- Operating season: Late March – last Sunday in October
- Area: 95 acres (38 ha)

Attractions
- Total: 54
- Roller coasters: 10
- Website: www.lagoonpark.com

Lagoon is a family owned amusement park in Farmington, Utah, located about 18 miles north of Salt Lake City. The park opened in 1886.

Lagoon is divided into five main areas: The Midway (containing the majority of the rides) Pioneer Village (features exhibits displaying pioneer buildings and artifacts, Lagoon A Beach (a water park), Kiddieland (features rides for small children), and X-Venture Zone (features upcharge rides).

Lagoon has ten roller coasters, most notably including Colossus the Fire Dragon, Roller Coaster, Wicked, and Cannibal.

== History ==
=== 1886–1939 ===
In 1886, the Denver & Rio Grande Western Railroad built a resort called Lake Park on the shores of the Great Salt Lake. It was one of several resorts built along the lake throughout the late 1800s. In the following years, however, the lake level receded drastically until Lake Park was far from the lake, and the park closed by the end of the 1895 season.

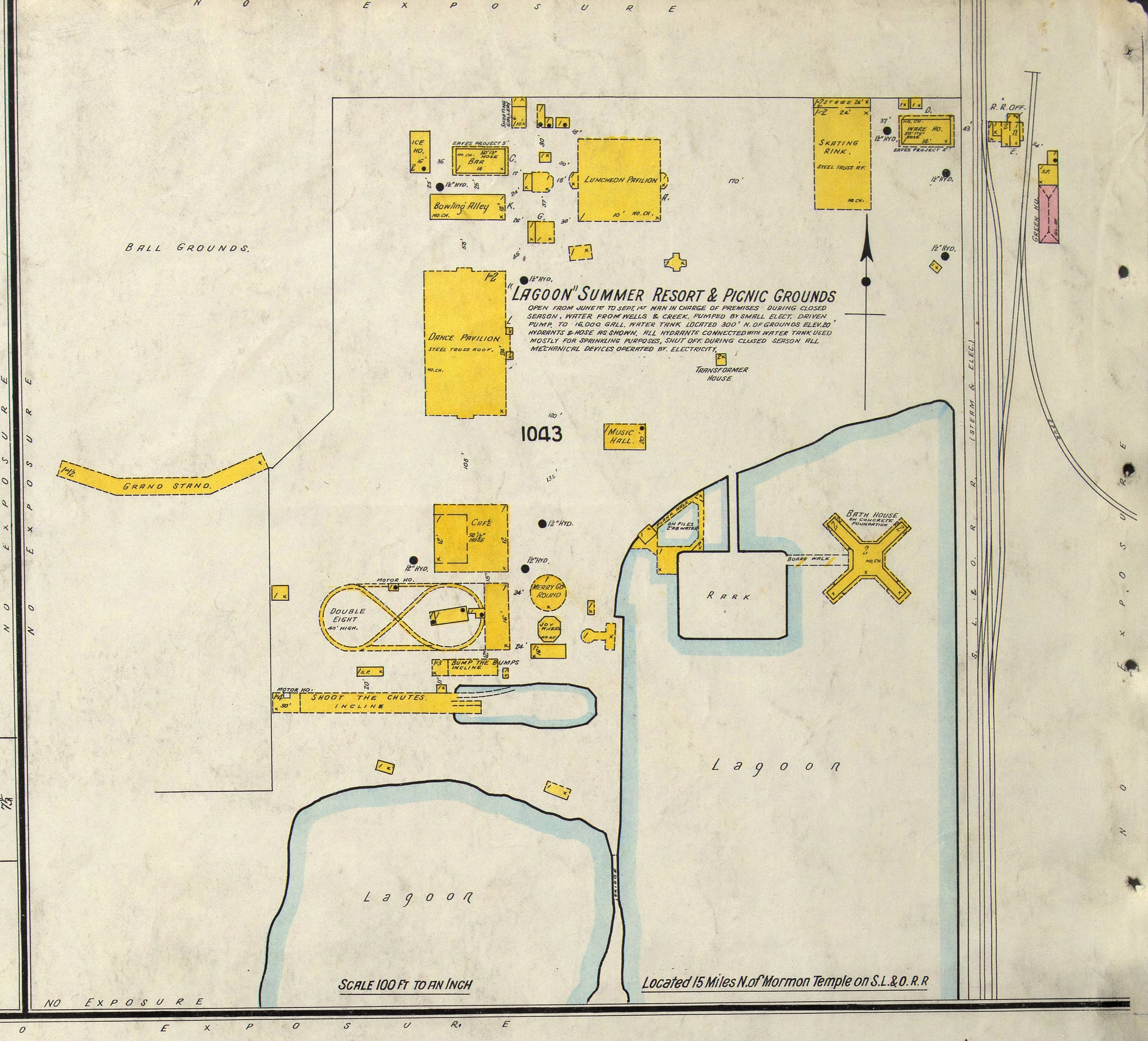
Sanborn Map of Lagoon (1911)

Simon Bamberger, who was building his Salt Lake & Ogden Railroad line from Salt Lake City to Ogden, Utah, was vice president of Lake Park. To increase passenger traffic on his line, he bought most of the original Lake Park buildings from the D&RGW and moved them about 3 miles (5 km) east near Farmington, Utah. The resort was named Lagoon for the small body of water located on the original forty acres (162,000 m^{2}) of the park. The original lagoon was enlarged to 9 acres (36,000 m^{2}) by clearing some swampland.

Lagoon opened in Farmington on July 12, 1896, and featured live music and restaurants. In 1900, guests began swimming and rowing boats in Lagoon Lake. Over time, rides were added, such as the authentic Herschell–Spillman carousel and Cagney miniature railroad. In 1901, the park hosted a minor league baseball team in the Inter-Mountain League and in 1902, a team in the Utah State League.

Lagoon's wooden coaster, Roller Coaster, was designed by John Miller and constructed in 1921. Its highest height is 57 feet (17 m), and it has 2,500 feet (760 m) of track. The ride lasts just under two minutes, and reaches speeds up to 45 mph (72 km/h).

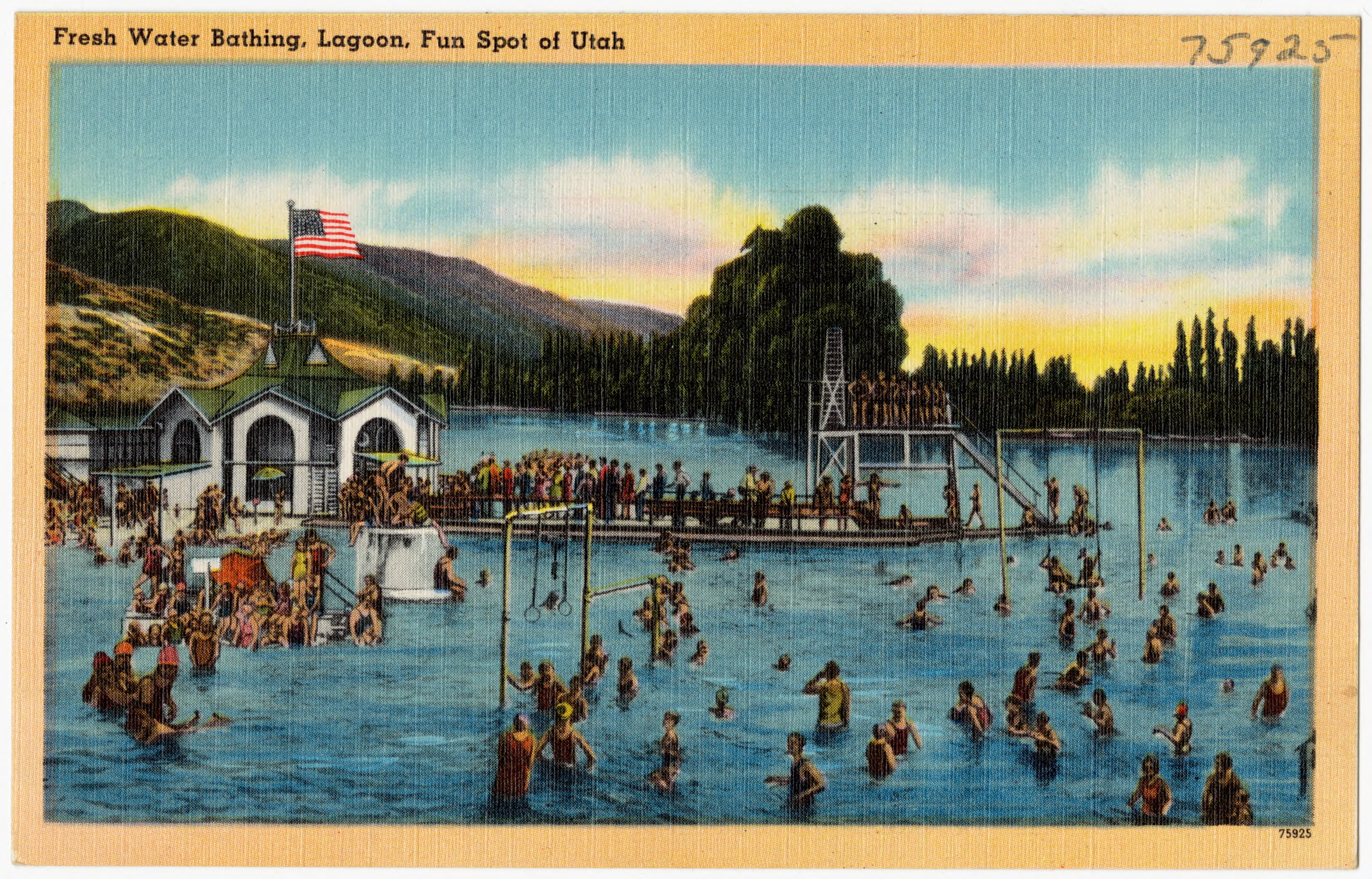
Swimmers on a 1940s postcard

In 1927, a 1.5×10^{6} US gal (5.7×10^{6} L) swimming pool was built north of Lagoon Lake. It was one of the first filtered swimming pools in western North America, and was a cleaner alternative than swimming in the briny Great Salt Lake.

Lagoon's popularity grew during the 1920s and 1930s. The park's first Fun House was built in 1929, along with many other midway shows, rides, and games. During the "Big Band" era, many notable musicians played on Lagoon's stage, including Artie Shaw, Benny Goodman, Duke Ellington, Count Basie, and Glenn Miller.

=== 1940–1970 ===
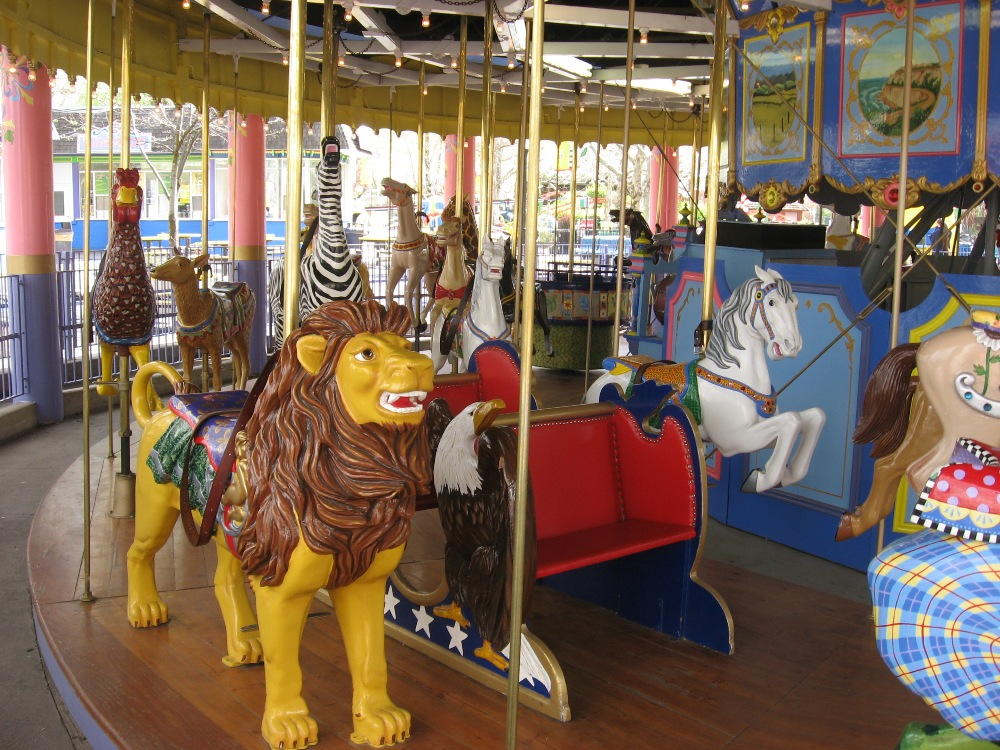
Lagoon's carousel

The park was closed for three seasons during World War II. By 1946, the park was in bad condition and on the brink of permanent closure. The Bamberger family considered razing it. However, Ranch S. Kimball and Robert E. Freed convinced the Bamberger family to lease the park to their newly formed Utah Amusement Corporation. Kimball served as president while Freed served as secretary and assistant manager. The Freed family's Lagoon Corporation later bought the resort outright from the Bamberger family in 1983.

When the Utah Amusement Corporation took over the lease of Lagoon, a Farmington town ordinance prohibited African-Americans from using the swimming pool and the ballroom. By the end of the 1940s, Robert Freed had fully opened Lagoon to the black community, and further extended this policy to the Terrace Ballroom (formerly the Rainbow Gardens) in Salt Lake City.

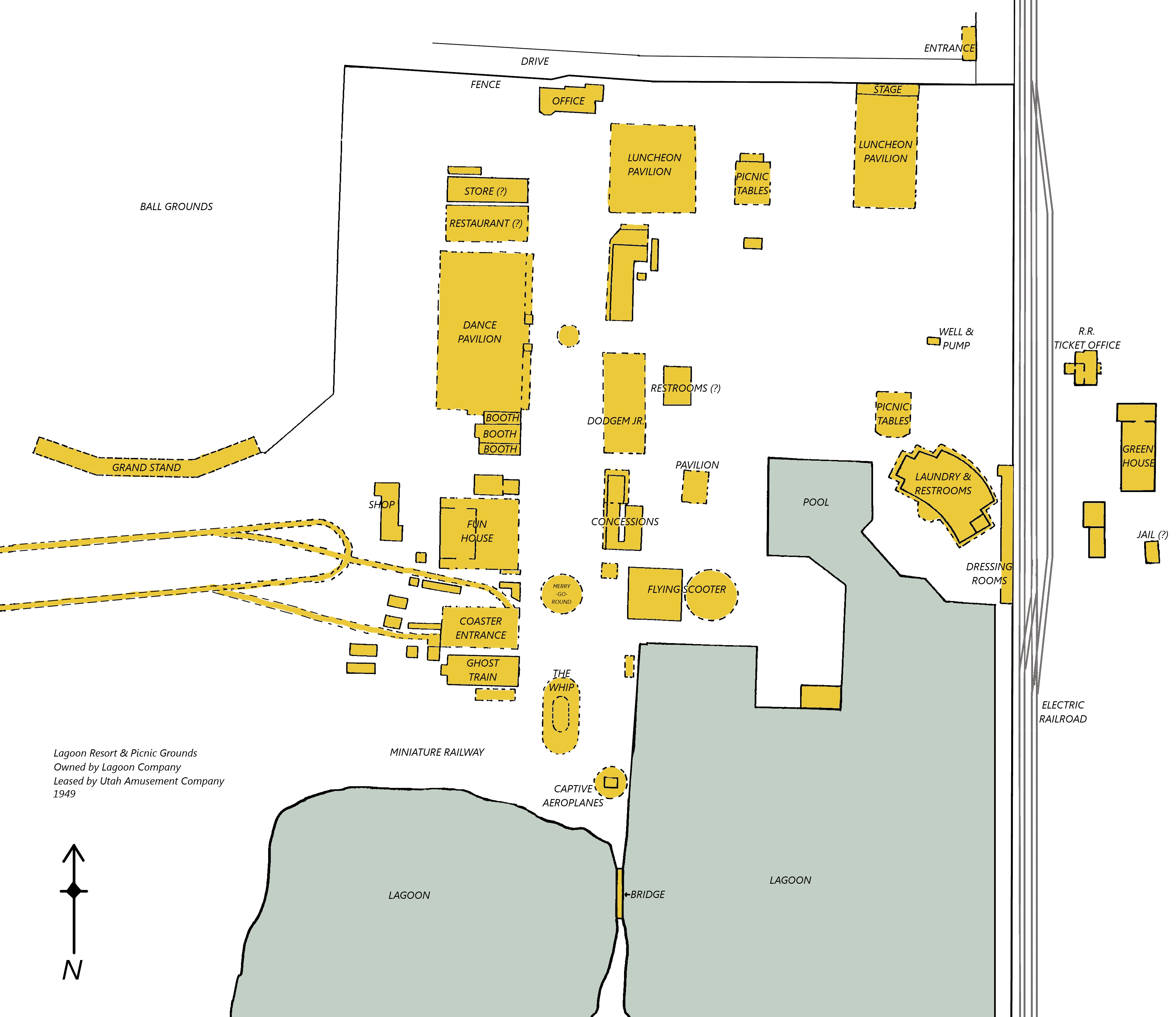
Map of Lagoon from 1949

The Freed family made several improvements, including an overhaul of the swimming pool in 1949, a rebuilt fun house, the introduction of the "Dodgem Cars" and the "Lakeshore Express" miniature railway in 1951, and a new Ferris wheel in 1953.

In November 1953, a fire destroyed much of the park, including the fun house, the dance pavilion, and the front portion of Roller Coaster, causing an estimated loss of over $500,000 in damages. Roller Coaster was rebuilt and reopened in time for the 1954 season. Many rides were restored, rebuilt, or replaced, and a few new rides were added in 1955. In 1956, Mother Gooseland, Lagoon's first themed section, was opened between the Midway and the swimming pool. It featured rides only for children.

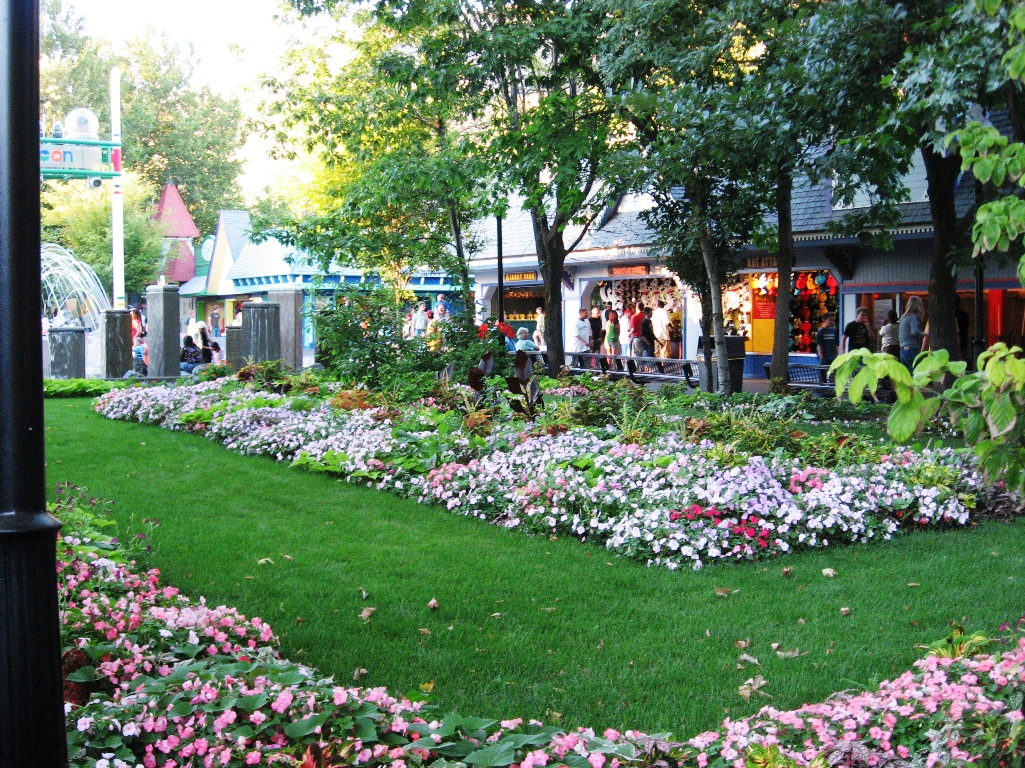
Gardens of Lagoon's Midway

From the mid-1950s into the 1960s, Lagoon made many improvements. A showboat was added to the lake, and a new fun house was built, which featured such attractions as a multi-lane giant slide, mazes, mirrors, obstacle courses, and mystery rooms. There was also a mini-car ride added in 1960, followed by the "Space Scrambler", spook house, I.Q. Zoo, and shooting gallery in 1961. A Wild Mouse coaster opened in 1965.

On the Midway, musicians including the Beach Boys, the Rolling Stones, the Kingston Trio, and Johnny Cash performed on the bandstand throughout the 1960s. The Beach Boys made mention of the park in the song "Salt Lake City" on their 1965 album Summer Days (And Summer Nights!!).

The 2 ft (610 mm) narrow-gauge Animaland Train began circling Lagoon Lake in 1967. In 1975, authentic steam locomotives built by Crown Metal Products were put into operation around the lake instead, and the railway's name was changed to the Wild Kingdom Train Zoo.

=== 1971–1997 ===
The Opera House Square opened in 1968 and showcased melodramas, musicals, and silent movies. In 1976, Lagoon expanded east by purchasing Pioneer Village, an old west town complete with several historic structures. The buildings were moved to Lagoon and the 2 ft (610 mm) narrow-gauge "Pioneer Village Railroad" (featuring "Old Ironsides", a Crown Metal Products locomotive) circled the town. In addition, the "Lagoon Miniature Railroad" looped around the residential area of Pioneer Village using an original miniature gauge steam locomotive acquired in the early 1900s. A log flume ride was brought in from the defunct Pixieland Park in Oregon.

In 1976, the Jet Star 2 roller coaster was added. Before Lagoon purchased it, it was an attraction at Spokane, Washington's Expo '74.

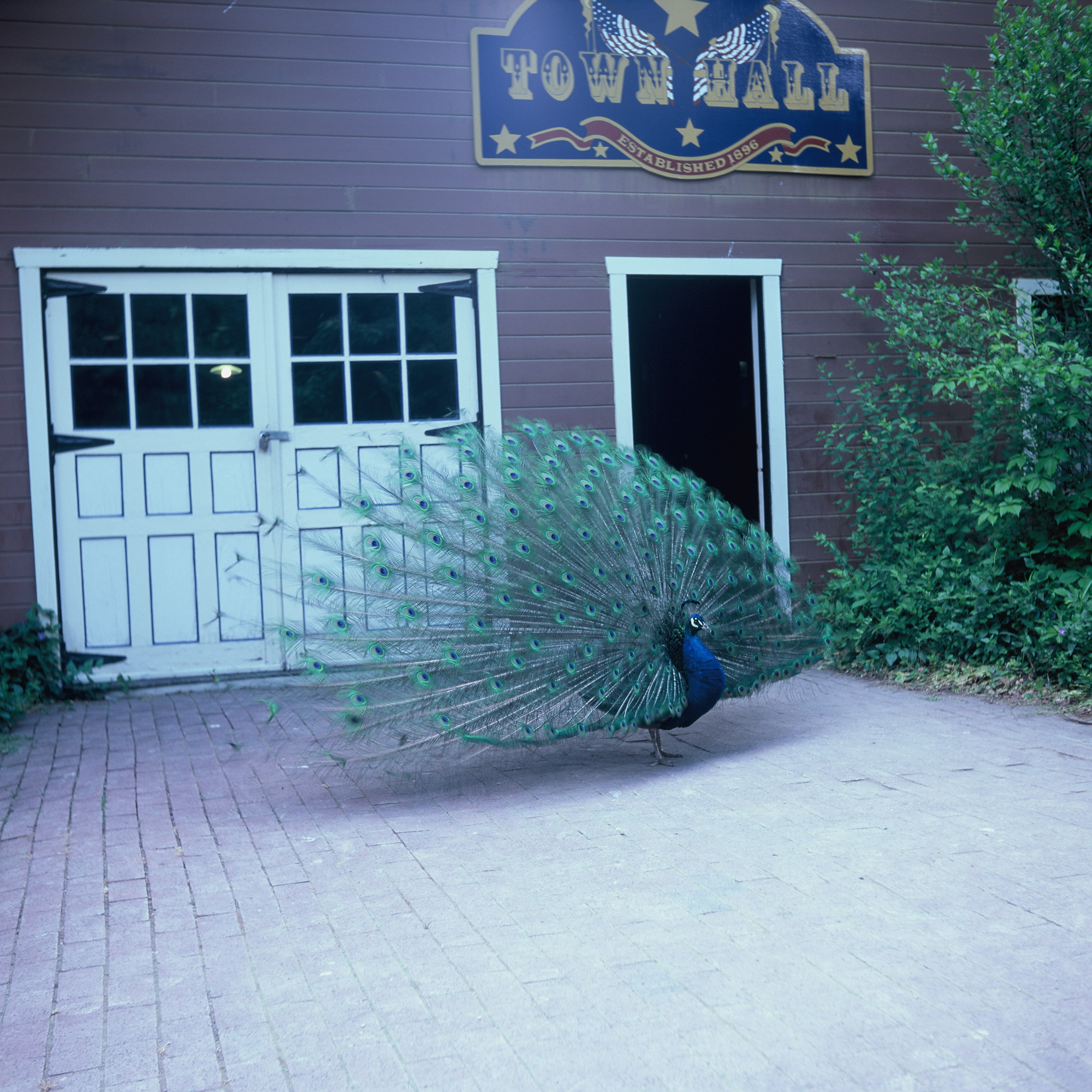
Peacock in front of Town Hall at Lagoon

Colossus the Fire Dragon came to Lagoon in 1983. It was selected by People magazine in 1984 as one of the top 10 coasters in the country. Colossus was Lagoon's first coaster to feature inversions, with a top speed of 55 mph (89 km/h). With its double inverted loops, Colossus had the most inversions of any coaster at Lagoon for 32 years until the opening of Cannibal in 2015.

In the late 1980s, both the old fun house and the "Haunted Shack", a walk-through dark attraction, were closed due to escalating maintenance costs and safety concerns. The swimming pool closed after its fifth decade in 1987. This made way for the $5.5 million Lagoon A Beach water park, which was completed in 1989. Its construction required the closure of miniature railroad operations in Pioneer Village, as some of the supports stood in the way of the track.

=== 1997–2009 ===
In 1997, in a major expansion of Pioneer Village, Lagoon added Rattlesnake Rapids, a river rapids ride located in the new Rattlesnake Plaza. In 1998, Lagoon added the Maurer AG Wild Mouse coaster. This ride replaced the wooden Wild Mouse coaster that had been demolished 5 years prior. In 1999, Lagoon opened its first attraction above the height of 200-foot (61 m): The Rocket, an S&S space shot tower with two different ride towers. In 2000, Samurai, a Mondial Top Scan, was built, as well as Double Thunder Raceway. In 2001, a Mondial Top Spin called Cliffhanger was opened. In 2002, Lagoon expanded its X-Venture Zone by adding Catapult, a reverse bungee ride. Spider, a Maurer AG steel spinning coaster, opened in 2003. In 2004, Lagoon revamped Kiddieland, giving it a garden theme and adding two new rides, Kontiki and Dragon Fly. In 2005, The Bat, an inverted coaster manufactured by Vekoma, was constructed near Lagoon A Beach. It is a family-friendly coaster with a minimum height requirement of 42 inches. In 2006, Lagoon expanded Kiddieland further by adding two new rides, Dinosaur Drop and Lady Bug Bop, both of which are Zierer Family Drop Towers.

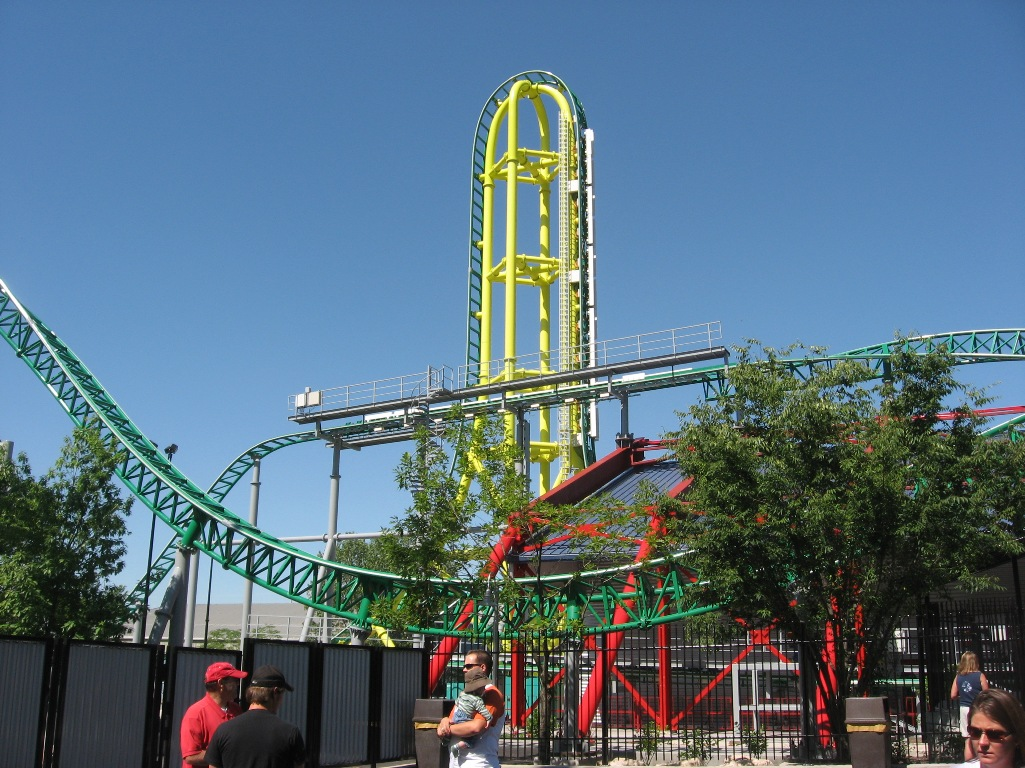
Wicked

On June 1, 2007, a $10 million roller coaster named Wicked opened. Wicked is a Zierer tower launch coaster, and is powered by linear synchronous motors that launch riders up a 100-foot (30 m) tower at 55 mph (89 km/h) in 2.5 seconds. It has several elements, including an Immelmann turn, a heartline roll, two half-pipe turns, and the signature "lake turn" into a final tunnel before returning to the station. Several improvements were made to the park in 2007 as well. On April 5, 2008, Lagoon opened OdySea, a Zierer "Flying Fish" ride with aquatic theming. OdySea is an interactive ride with a joystick to control the vehicle's height. Arrows blink to direct the rider to dodge jets of water from the sea creatures that attempt to soak the rider as accompanying audio tells a story. On April 4, 2009, Lagoon opened "Jumping Dragon", a Zierer "Dragon Roundabout" ride.

=== 2010–present ===
In 2010, Lagoon revamped its Ferris wheel, Sky Scraper. It was dismantled after the 2009 season, and reopened with a new coat of paint in April 2010. As a result of the economic crisis, Lagoon did not install a new ride that season. Instead, the park improved its entertainment division with several new shows. In 2011, Lagoon installed another family roller coaster, named BomBora. The coaster was created by a group of manufacturers and Lagoon itself, and has a height of 45 feet (14 m), as well as a theme based on 1960s surfing.

In 2012, Lagoon became the focus of animal welfare groups' protests which called for a boycott of the park, citing USDA inspection reports that suggested poor care of animals in the Wild Kingdom Train Zoo. The Utah Animal Rights Coalition and PETA pointed to a range of USDA citations over a 15-year span that included insufficient living space for and unexplained deaths of animals. While admitting to some problems, a Lagoon spokesman denied any abuse taking place and said veterinarians and staff regularly monitored the animals.

In 2012, Lagoon installed a ride called Air Race. In 2013, Lagoon began work on a new coaster at the site of the former Top Eliminator. Two new family rides opened for the 2013 season, Tipsey Tea Cups and Red Rock Rally, both of which were manufactured by Zamperla. In 2014, Lagoon continued work on a new coaster, building vertically throughout the entire operating season. With much of its focus on the new coaster, no new rides were added this year. Due to maintenance problems, Lagoon-A-Beach's old Rip-Curl slide was replaced with a new slide of the same name. At a press conference on September 4, 2014, Lagoon officially announced Cannibal, a new roller coaster for the 2015 season. On July 2, 2015, Cannibal opened, featuring a 197-foot (60 m) elevator lift hill, a 116° beyond vertical drop, three inversions, and a top speed of 70 mph.

Shortly after Cannibal's opening, the park began the early planning stages of Primordial. In 2016, Lagoon did not add any attractions. However, extensive work was done on Spider. In 2017, a mural by Sril Art was created at the park. Two new rides were added to Kiddieland: Flying Tigers and Ruka Safari. In 2018, the Roller Coaster was re-tracked. A new ride opened in Kiddieland called Engine 86 in 2020. On December 18, 2021, a fire broke out at the Carousel Candy shop. The fire rekindled that evening and subsequently destroyed the candy shop and the adjacent Scamper, a miniature bumper cars ride. In 2023, Lagoon opened Primordial, a 4D interactive dark ride roller coaster, after eight years of development and construction. The attraction is located inside an artificial mountain and includes multiple ride endings. In late 2024, construction fences were put in place on the site of the former Log Flume attraction, featuring a banner for a new themed area entitled The District. In November 2024, Lagoon announced that The District would include three new rides when it opened. One of these rides was announced on November 21st in a social media post as SteamWorx, an ART Engineering Wild Swing. This was followed by a second announcement on November 26th of a Zamperla NebulaZ called Time Tinker. On January 3, 2025, Lagoon announced that the third ride would be a "reimagining" of an existing ride, with the former Helicopters attraction being rethemed as Rivets and Rotors. Cliffhanger was also removed.

In March 2025 the park announced it would be phasing out its zoo by the end of the year. The stated reason was to free up space for future expansion. The zoo's big cats were moved to the Wild Animal Sanctuary in Keenesburg, Colorado. On May 24, 2025, the new themed area, The District, opened to the public. On October 10, 2025, Lagoon announced the addition of Nutcracker, an S&S Screamin' Swing thrill ride, which opened in 2026. On October 22nd, 2025, Lagoon announced that Jet Star 2 had reached the end of its service life and would be retired. The attraction closed on November 9, 2025, coinciding with the end of the 2025 season.

On October 3, 2026, Lagoon announced the addition of J3 Grand Prix, an Intamin Hot Racer roller coaster. The ride is the first of its kind in the United States and is set to open in 2027.

== Attractions ==
Thrill level (out of 5)
1 (Children's ride) 2 (mild) 3 (moderate) 4 (high) 5 (aggressive) 6 (extreme)

=== Roller coasters ===
Lagoon features ten different roller coasters. The oldest, Roller Coaster, was built in 1921 and is an American Coaster Enthusiasts (ACE) Roller Coaster Landmark.

Name	Manufacturer	Type	Year opened	Description	Location	Thrill rating
Roller Coaster	Miller & Baker	Wooden	1921	One of the oldest roller coasters in the world. Partially damaged by fire in 1953 but repaired and reopened.	South Midway	5
Colossus the Fire Dragon	Schwarzkopf	Steel	1983	87-foot lift hill with back-to-back double loop and two large helices	South Midway	6
Puff the Little Fire Dragon	Zierer	Steel	1985	A small coaster intended for young children with only a small drop and hill	Kiddieland	2
Wild Mouse	Maurer AG	Steel wild mouse	1998	The third wild mouse coaster to be located at Lagoon. Features tight turns and sudden drops.	South Midway	5
Spider	Maurer AG	Steel spinning	2003	Originally called "The Spider and the Fly". Features tight turns and spinning cars.	South Midway	5
The Bat	Vekoma	Steel inverted	2005	A Suspended Family Coaster and the only inverted coaster at Lagoon	Kiddieland	3
Wicked	Zierer	Steel launched	2007	LSM-launched coaster with several inversions	South Midway	6
BomBora	ART Engineering, Lagoon	Steel	2011	A short family coaster with smooth turns and small drops	Kiddieland	3
Cannibal	ART Engineering, Lagoon	Steel	2015	The second-steepest roller coaster in the United States, with a first drop at 116 degrees. It features several inversions.	North Midway	6
Primordial	ART Engineering, Lagoon	Steel	2023	Development began in 2015, and construction began in 2018, but the latter was temporarily suspended due to the COVID-19 pandemic. Construction resumed in early 2021. Primordial opened towards the end of the 2023 season. It has interactive 4D elements.	North Midway	5

=== Thrill rides ===
Name	Manufacturer	Year opened	Type	Description	Location	Thrill rating
Air Race	Zamperla	2012	Air Race	An airplane ride with vehicles looping sideways while circling a central point	North Midway	4
Centennial Screamer	HUSS Park Attractions	1987	Enterprise	Consists of 20 cars around a disc. As the ride begins to spin, the disc stays in a horizontal position. When speed and centrifugal forces increase, the ride is lifted to a near-vertical position as the disc continues to spin.	North Midway	5
Nutcracker	S&S Worldwide	2026	Screamin' Swing	Swing ride	South Midway	6
Rock-O-Plane	Eyerly Aircraft Company	1954	Rock-O-Plane	Similar to a Ferris wheel, but with inverting cars	South Midway	4
Rocket	S&S Worldwide	1999	Drop tower	A drop tower with two different ride types: "Blast Off", a rapid vertical ascent, and "Re-Entry", a slow ascent followed by a powered drop	North Midway	6
Samurai	Mondial	2000	Top Scan	Six radial arms that spin as the entire ride rotates through an oval arc in either direction	North Midway	6

=== Dark rides ===
Name	Year opened	Type	Location	Thrill rating
Dracula's Castle	1974	Dark ride	Central Midway	3
Terroride	1967	Dark ride	Central Midway	3

=== Water rides ===
Name	Manufacturer	Year opened	Type	Description	Location	Thrill rating
Rattlesnake Rapids	Intamin	1997	River Rapids	A river rapids ride. Features a tunnel and several waterfalls.	Pioneer Village	4

=== Family rides ===
Name	Manufacturer	Year opened	Type	Description	Location	Thrill rating
Boomerang	Ihle	1977	Bumper cars	A bumper cars ride	North Midway	2
Flying Aces	Bisch Rocco	1941	Flying Scooters	An airplane-type ride. Riders can move the front sail of their cars freely.	North Midway	2
Merry-Go-Round	Herschell–Spillman Company	1918	Carousel	A Herschell–Spillman Company carousel built circa 1913 and installed at Lagoon in 1918.	South Midway	1
Musik Express	Mack Rides	1982	Music Express	A spinning ride	South Midway	3
Paratrooper	Frank Hrubetz & Company	1966	Paratrooper	An elevated spinning ride	North Midway	3
Sky Scraper	Bussink	1991	Ferris wheel	A 150-foot Nauta-Bussink R50 wheel with spinning gondolas	North Midway	2
Sky Ride	Hopkins Rides	1974	Elevated gondola ride	An elevated gondola ride that spans across the entire park	North and South Midway	1
Space Scrambler	Eli Bridge Company	1961	Scrambler	A spinning ride	North Midway	3
Tidal Wave	HUSS Park Attractions	1980	Swinging ship	A swinging ship ride	South Midway	3
Tilt-A-Whirl	Sellner Manufacturing	1954	Tilt-A-Whirl	A ride with a spinning platform and individually spinning cars	North Midway	3
Turn of the Century	Zierer	1987	Wave Swinger	A rotating swing ride	South Midway	3
Wild Kingdom Train Zoo	Crown Metal Products	1975	Miniature train	A train ride that goes through a tunnel and circles Lagoon Lake, passing by many animal exhibits	South Midway	1
Time Tinker	Zamperla	2025	NebulaZ	A spinning ride that has many near miss elements	Pioneer Village	3
Steamworx	ART Engineering	2025	Wild Swing	Family ride that swings with the movement of the gondola	Pioneer Village	3

=== Children's rides ===
All of these attractions are located in the park's Kiddieland section.

Name	Manufacturer	Year opened	Type	Description	Thrill rating
Baby Boats	Allan Herschell	Unknown	Boat ride	Small boats travel in an oval formation while surfaced on water.	1
Bulgy	Eyerly Aircraft	1956	Bulgy the Whale	Riders sit in small whale carts that jump up and down.	1
Dinosaur Drop	Zierer	2006	Jumpin' Star	A 40 foot drop tower	3
The Dragonfly	Eli Bridge Company	2004	Dragonfly	A spinning ride.	1
Engine 86	Zamperla	2020	Crazy Bus	A fire engine themed ride.	2
Flying Tigers	Zamperla	2017	Flying Tigers	An airplane ride on an oval track with tight turns. The airplanes slightly tilt on the turns.	2
Jumping Dragon	Zierer	2009	Jumping Dragon	A family spinning ride with a Chinese dragon theme; rotates clockwise, then reverses direction.	2
Kontiki	Zierer	2004	Kontiki	A swinging and spinning ride.	2
Ladybug Bop	Zamperla	2006	Jumpin' Star	A 40 foot drop tower.	3
Moonraker	Zamperla	1983	Space Age	Spaceship carts that move in a circular formation.	2
OdySea	Zierer	2008	Flying Gondolas	Robotic sea creatures serve as cars that travel in a circular formation. Sea creatures squirt water at riders while riders use joystick controls to avoid the water.	3
Red Baron	Bradley & Kaye	1984	Red Baron	A ride similar to Helicopters.	1
Red Rock Rally	Zamperla	2013	Speedway	A spinning ride with Jeep carts.	1
Rivets and Rotors	Allan Herschell	1963	Helicoptors	A ride meant for small children with themed helicopter carts that can go up and down using a joystick you control.	2
Ruka Safari	Zamperla	2017	Jump Around	A ride with safari jeeps that bounce while rotating in a small circle.	2
Scaliwags	Mulligan	1986	Scalawags	A small spinning ride with animals as cars.	2
Sky Fighter	Allan Herschell	1954	Airplane	A small airplane ride with two-person cars.	2
Speedway Jr.	Mulligan	1978	Speedway Jr.	Miniature cars going around a track.	1
Tipsy Tea Cups	Zamperla	2013	Teacups	A teacup spinning ride.	3

=== X-Venture Zone ===
Each ride in the X-Venture Zone is an upcharge attraction.

Name	Year opened	Type	Description
Skycoaster	1995	Skycoaster	One of the first Skycoaster rides in the United States. The launch tower is 153 feet (47 m) tall and the main arch is 173 feet (53 m) tall. The flyers are raised up to a height of 143 feet (44 m). When they are instructed to do so, one of the flyers pulls the rip cord and then they drop rapidly, reaching speeds up to 80 miles per hour (130 km/h) and experiencing sensations similar to skydiving.
Double Thunder Raceway	2000	Go-karts	Go-karts attraction that consists of two separate tracks: Lightning at 1,146 feet (349 m) and Thunder at 1,142 feet (348 m). Each track has 28 cars and features several sweeping turns, overpasses, 360-degree spirals, straight-aways, and camelbacks.
Catapult	2002	Catapult	Hurls two passengers at a time up to 250 feet (76 m) in the air.

=== Lagoon A Beach ===
Name	Type	Description
Mooch's Mainstream	Lazy river	
Pipeline Slides	Four water slides	Features four slides: Pipeline, Shout, Twist, and Wipeout
Serpentine Slides	Three water slides	Features three slides: Backdoor, Ripcurl, and Seasnake
Speed Slides	Two water slides	Features two slides: Liquid Lightning and The Drop
The Outrigger	Water slide	

== Incidents ==
- On August 20, 1934, 20-year-old Ernest Henry Howe of Ogden died after attempting to stand up while riding Roller Coaster, and subsequently falling out of the train.
- On August 31, 1946, 23-year-old James Young Hess of Farmington, an employee at the park, was thrown to the ground while repairing scaffolding on Roller Coaster. It was reported that he may have been attempting to grab onto the car and ride it back down to the station, but he instead lost his grip and fell 18 feet to the ground. Hess died from his injuries the next day in a Salt Lake City hospital.
- On June 10, 1983, 16-year-old Shauna Bingham was working at the Colossus the Fire Dragon roller coaster. While attempting to run electrical wire inside the ride enclosure as the ride was operating, she was struck by an oncoming train, losing her left arm at the shoulder.
- On April 30, 1989, six-year-old Ryan Beckstead of Bountiful was struck and killed on Puff the Little Fire Dragon after he fell off the ride and stood up in between the track, before being hit in the head by the oncoming train. At the time, park representatives stated that this was the first accidental death in Lagoon's history, having lost the records of the previous incidents that occurred decades earlier under different ownership.
- On June 9, 1989, 13-year-old Kilee King of Bountiful slipped out from the restraints of Roller Coaster and fell 35 feet to her death. Lagoon made safety adjustments to the trains before reopening the ride, and new restraints were added the following year.
- On August 14, 2021, a 32-year-old man fell 50 feet after dangling from the park's Sky Ride, a chairlift-like ride which transports people from one end of the amusement park to the other. The man succumbed to his injuries in the hospital the next day.

== In popular culture ==
- The Beach Boys mention Lagoon by name in the song "Salt Lake City" on their 1965 album Summer Days (And Summer Nights!!).
- The opening scenes of the 1969 film Mirror, Mirror: You and Your Self Image were filmed at Lagoon.
- Lagoon was one of many parks featured in the first roller coaster documentary, America Screams in 1978.
- An episode of the Werewolf TV series was filmed at Lagoon in fall of 1987, featuring scenes in and around the Dracula's Castle attraction.
- Some scenes in the 1996 TV movie, Terror in the Family, were filmed on Roller Coaster and Centennial Screamer.
- In My Sister's Shadow, a 1997 TV movie, featured a scene on the North Midway.
- The Luck of the Irish, a 2001 Disney Channel original movie. A few scenes were filmed on the North Midway of Lagoon. The dance festival scene was shot in front of the entrance to the Sky Scraper.
- Wieners, a movie released in 2008, had a montage featuring scenes filmed at Lagoon in 2007. The name of the park was changed in the film.
- An episode of The Aquabats! Super Show! featured brief and edited shots of Lagoon.
- In 2015, Christmas Land was filmed in the Pioneer Village section of the park.
- Season 3, episode 12 of Andi Mack featured brief and edited shots of Lagoon, including Paratrooper, Cannibal, and Sky Scraper.
