= Colossus the Fire Dragon =

Roller coaster in Farmington, Utah

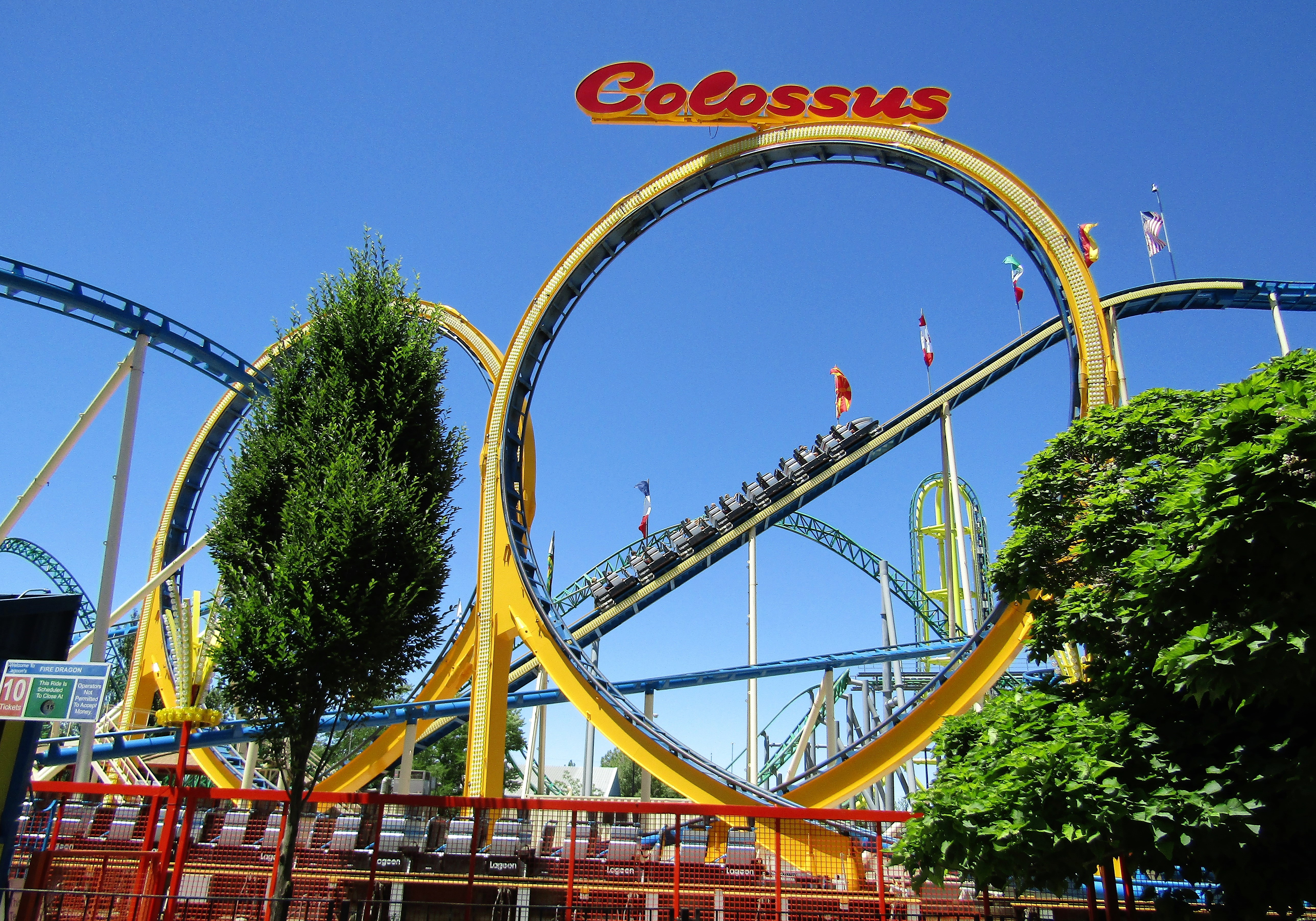
- Colossus in June 2017

Lagoon Amusement Park
- Location: Lagoon Amusement Park
- Park section: South Midway
- Coordinates: 40.9836°N 111.8951°W
- Status: Operating
- Opening date: 1983
- Cost: US$2,500,000

General statistics
- Type: Steel
- Manufacturer: Anton Schwarzkopf
- Designer: Ingenieur Büro Stengel GmbH
- Model: Double Looping (with additional trackway curve)
- Track layout: Figure 8
- Lift/launch system: Chain lift hill
- Height: 85 ft (26 m)
- Drop: 81 ft (25 m)
- Length: 2,850 ft (870 m)
- Speed: 55 mph (89 km/h)
- Inversions: 2
- Duration: 1:45
- Max vertical angle: 60°
- G-force: 4.9 (Back Seat); 4.0 (Front Seat)
- Restraint style: Lap Bar
- Height restriction: 46 in (117 cm)
- Trains: 3 trains with 7 cars; riders arranged 2 across in 2 rows for a total of 28 riders per train
- Colossus the Fire Dragon at RCDB

Colossus the Fire Dragon, also known as Colossus, or simply Fire Dragon, is a Schwarzkopf double-looping roller coaster that opened at Lagoon Amusement Park in Farmington, Utah in 1983.

== Description ==
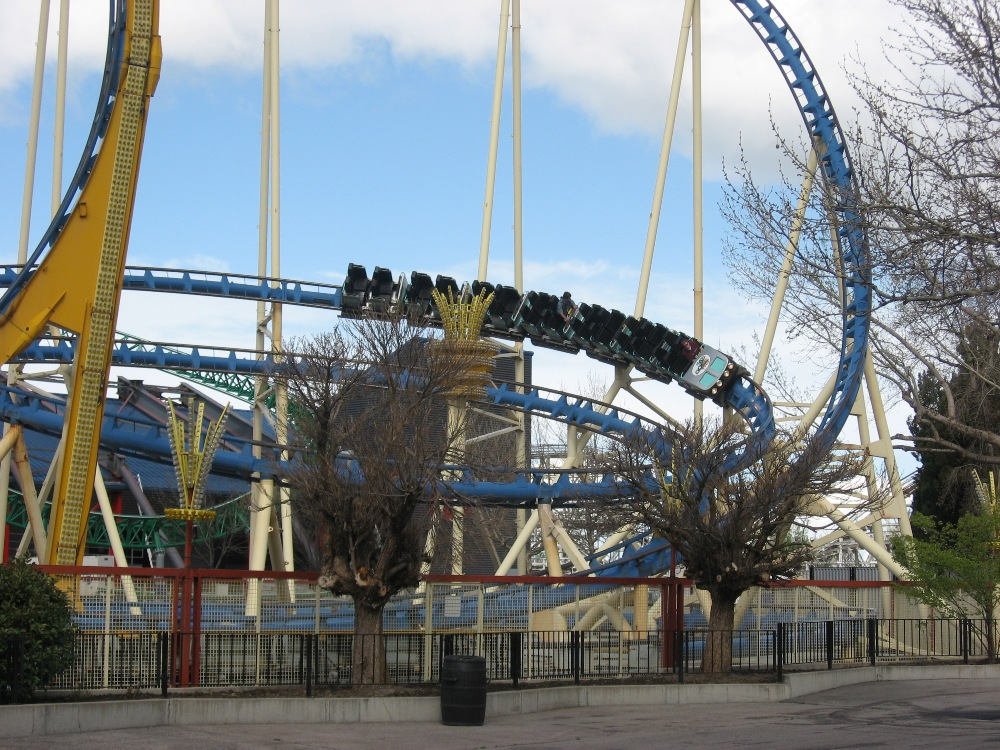
An external view of Colossus, watching an empty train begin the helix segment, April 2007

The coaster sends riders 85 feet (26 m) up the lift hill, then into a smooth 1/3 right turn. Riders then fall into a fast, twisting plummet to the ground, then through two 65-foot (20 m) high-G vertical loops and two helix turns. The first helix turn is very large, arcing over the elevated portion of the ride's queue, then up and through the second loop. After that, the train passes just over the station's roof, then down and around, turning diagonally between the two loops into the G-inducing helix back to the station. This helix is sometimes referred to as a 'slanted spiral' or the 'upward-downward helix,' because it turns downward, upward, then downward again at equal angles into a large turn that leads back to the station, giving the entire element a 'slanted' look.

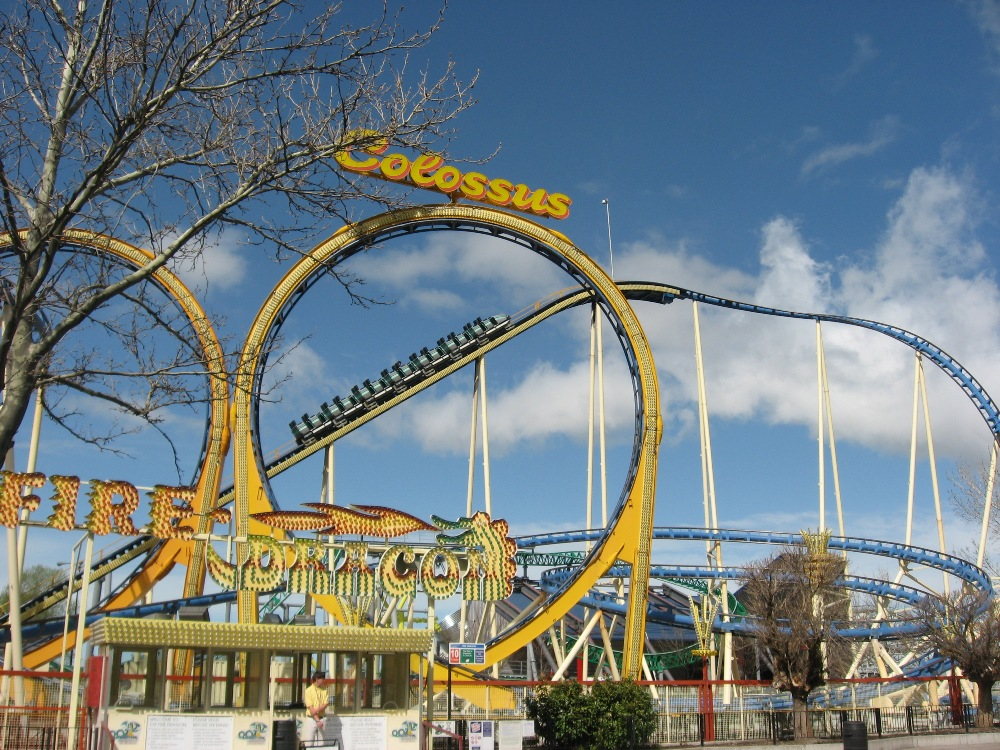
Colossus in April 2007

== Unique aspects ==
Colossus is one of two double looping Anton Schwarzkopf roller coasters in the United States, the other being Shock Wave at Six Flags Over Texas, which opened in 1978. There were three of the coaster type until Laser at Dorney Park & Wildwater Kingdom closed at the end of 2008. Colossus is also unique because it has an extra curve in its helix. The coaster is located in front of Wicked, another coaster at Lagoon.

== Appearance ==
Colossus' track is blue with white supports and a yellow color scheme on the two vertical loops. The ride features orange and yellow lights which are turned on at night.

Colossus' trains are silver and white, with headlights and a decal of a green dragon on the front car. On the sides of the train there are two stripes of either green, blue, or red. The trains have no over-the-shoulder restraints, offering more freedom for riders.

The lift hill is decorated with flags from various countries.

== Naming history ==
The roller coaster's name was intended to be simply "Colossus", but the "Fire Dragon" surname was added so there would be no confusion between Colossus at Six Flags Magic Mountain and Colossus at Lagoon.

== Relocation ==
Colossus is a portable roller coaster, so it was fairly inexpensive, costing around US$2.5 million. It can be dismantled and rebuilt within a day. It traveled on a European fair circuit for approximately two years, before Lagoon purchased the attraction. The ride was later installed at Lagoon in 1983, where it has operated since.

== Other notes ==
Colossus is 2,850 feet (870 m) long and has top speeds of 55 mph. Its G-force is 4.8 gs. Colossus can accommodate three trains running simultaneously, but has not done so since 1999. Currently, Colossus runs a maximum of two trains when the park is busy. However, all 3 trains are used in a rotation according to maintenance schedules. The train that has accumulated the most runtime is removed to be refurbished while the other two are running.

== Incidents ==
On June 10, 1983, a teenage employee lost her arm while working near the roller coaster.
