= Wild Kingdom Train Zoo =

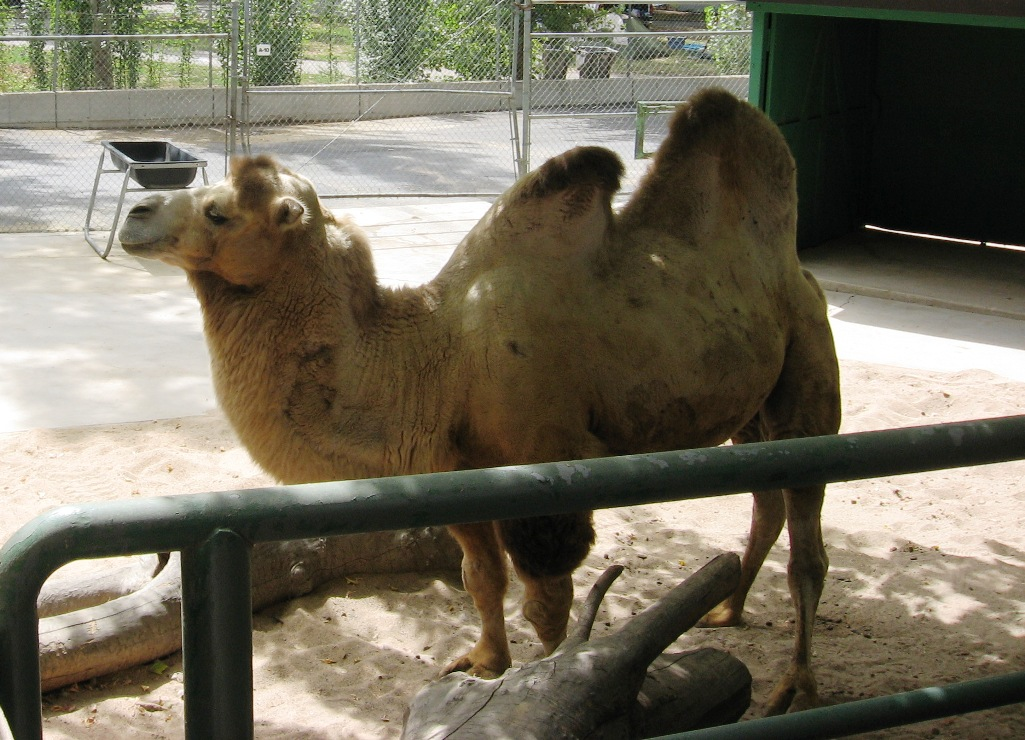
- Interactive map of Wild Kingdom Train Zoo
- 40.9834°N 111.8923°W
- Date opened: 1967
- Date closed: March 6, 2025
- Location: Farmington, Utah, United States
- No. of animals: 40+
- No. of species: 15+
- Website: http://www.lagoonpark.com/ride/wild-kingdom-train/

Wild Kingdom Train Zoo was a small zoo located in Lagoon Amusement Park, Farmington, Utah. Visible when riding the Wild Kingdom Train, the zoo was located on the banks of a pond. In 1967, the Animaland Train opened, taking guests past the various animal exhibits. The name of the attraction was changed in 1975 to the Wild Kingdom Train. The park has advertised the zoo as the second-largest zoo in Utah. On March 6, 2025, it was announced that the zoo would be closing and the animals rehomed.

== Wild Kingdom Train ==
The 2 ft (610 mm) narrow gauge railway had two steam-powered engines named Houston and Merriweather. Both were built by Crown Metal Products (CMP). The Merriweather locomotive had previously been named Old Ironsides when it ran on a now-defunct separate railway of the same gauge in the park named Pioneer Village Railroad. When that railroad closed, Old Ironsides was taken to the Wild Kingdom attraction and given its most recent name. Around the same time, one of the two other locomotives on the Wild Kingdom Train (also built by CMP) was taken out of service, put on static display, and re-themed to match the nearby Rattlesnake Rapids attraction complete with Rattlesnake Railroad decorum on the tender.

Guests boarded the train at a train station located on the South Midway of Lagoon. The train traveled clockwise around a lagoon, through a tunnel, past the animal exhibits, and returned to the station.

== Controversy ==
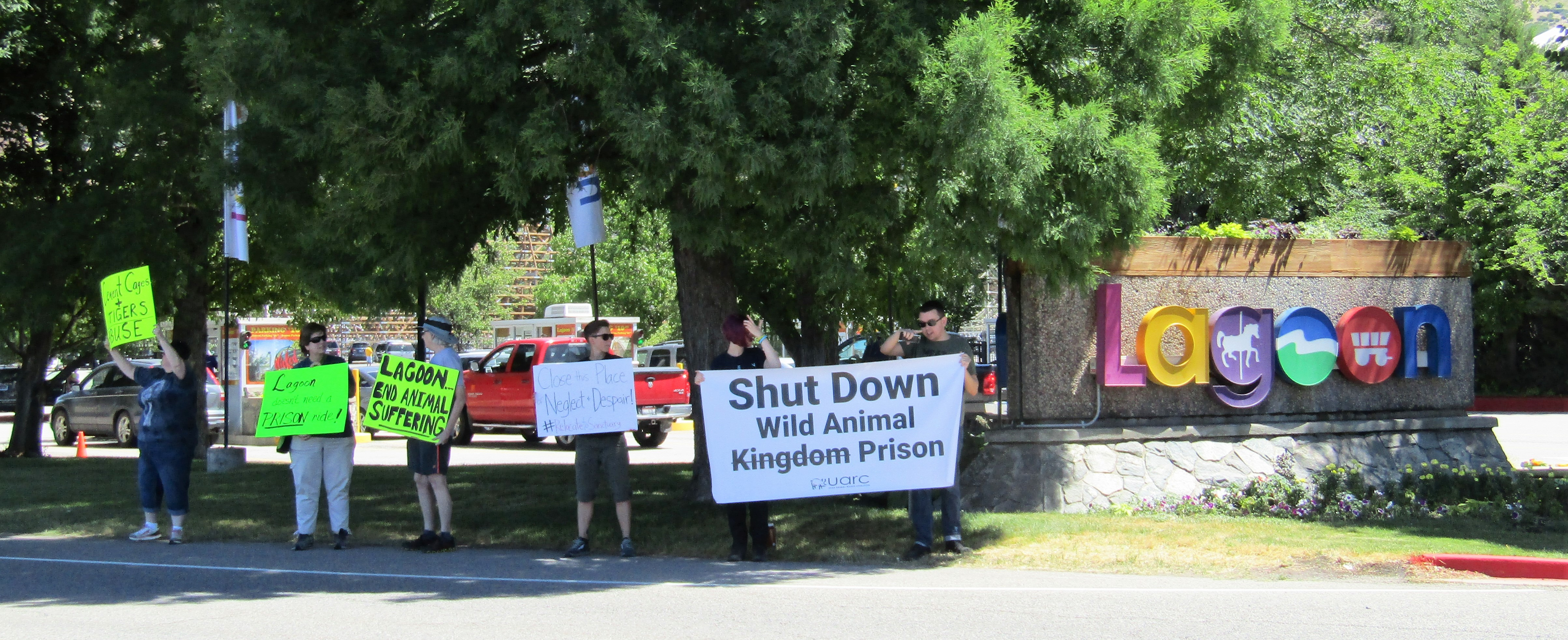
Protest against the zoo in July 2018

In 2012, Lagoon became the focus of animal welfare groups' protests which called for a boycott of the park, citing USDA inspection reports that suggested poor care of animals in the Wild Kingdom Train Zoo. The Utah Animal Rights Coalition (UARC) and PETA pointed to a range of USDA citations over a 15-year span that included insufficient living space for and unexplained deaths of animals. While admitting to some problems, a Lagoon spokesman denied any abuse taking place and said veterinarians and staff regularly monitored the animals.

In July 2016, two Utah teenagers started a petition in an effort to convince Lagoon to improve the living conditions of the animals.

In March 2025, it was announced that the zoo would be closing and the animals rehomed. Several of the zoo's big cats had already been relocated in late 2024 to The Wild Animal Sanctuary in Colorado.
