= Jet Star 2 (Lagoon) =

Former roller coaster in Farmington, Utah

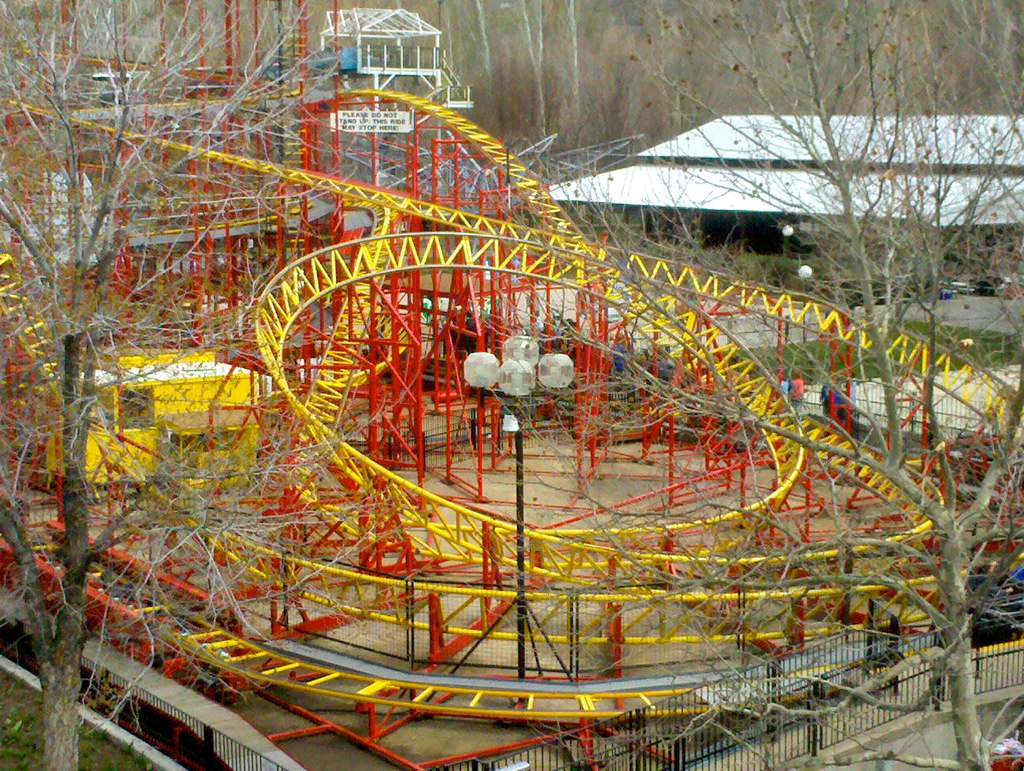
- Jet Star 2 in April 2010

Lagoon Amusement Park
- Location: Lagoon Amusement Park
- Park section: North Midway
- Coordinates: 40.98694455357574°N 111.89356595277786°W
- Status: Removed
- Opening date: April 3, 1976
- Closing date: November 9, 2025
- Cost: $500,000

General statistics
- Type: Steel
- Manufacturer: Anton Schwarzkopf
- Model: Jet Star 2
- Height: 44.3 ft (13.5 m)
- Length: 1,913.3 ft (583.2 m)
- Inversions: 0
- Height restriction: 50 in (127 cm)
- Trains: Single train with a single car. Riders are arranged 1 across in 6 rows for a total of 6 riders per train.
- Jet Star 2 at RCDB

Jet Star 2 was a Schwarzkopf steel roller coaster at Lagoon Amusement Park in Farmington, Utah. It opened in 1976.

== History ==
Jet Star 2 was designed by Anton Schwarzkopf as a catalog design in 1970, and was the first of its type to come to North America. Jet Star 2 originally operated at the 1974 World's Fair in Spokane, Washington. After the fair ended, Lagoon purchased Jet Star 2 and relocated it to the park in 1976. Since its relocation to Lagoon, the ride was located in the park's North Midway. Jet Star 2 has suffered many mechanical problems in the past, but its systems were overhauled in recent years to be more reliable.

Previously, Jet Star 2 had a lighted sign at the top of its lift hill. This sign was removed when the ride was repainted with its current red and yellow color scheme in 2006. Before 2005, the colors on Jet Star 2 were reversed, with red track and yellow supports. In 2012, Jet Star 2's loading platform was remodeled slightly so that its capacity could be increased.

Jet Star 2 had a large enough impact on the local residents of Spokane during the 1974 World's Fair that local brewery NoLi Brewhouse named one of their brews "Jet Star" after the ride.

On October 22, 2025, it was announced Jet Star 2 would close at the end of the 2025 season.

== Ride experience ==
The ride started with a spiral lift. Once at the top of the lift, the train descended a hill, then took a left turn, another right turn, and another smaller drop. The ride then entered a series of drops and turns before hitting the final reduction and staging brake run, and stopping at an unloading station. After unloading, the vehicles returned to the loading station. The ride stood at 44.3 feet tall.

Jet Star 2's trains were unique in that they did not have lap bar restraints like a traditional roller coaster. Instead, the restraints were much more like seat belts in a traditional automobile that allowed for more freedom among riders. Riders sometimes had to ride on the laps of larger riders if they wished to ride together. Each train had three of these large seats available, allowing for up to six riders at a time. Lagoon's policy was that no single riders may ride on Jet Star 2 and that two riders are required in the front section of the train, allowing a maximum of 8 riders per train.
