= Bat (Lagoon) =

Roller coaster in Farmington, Utah

The Bat
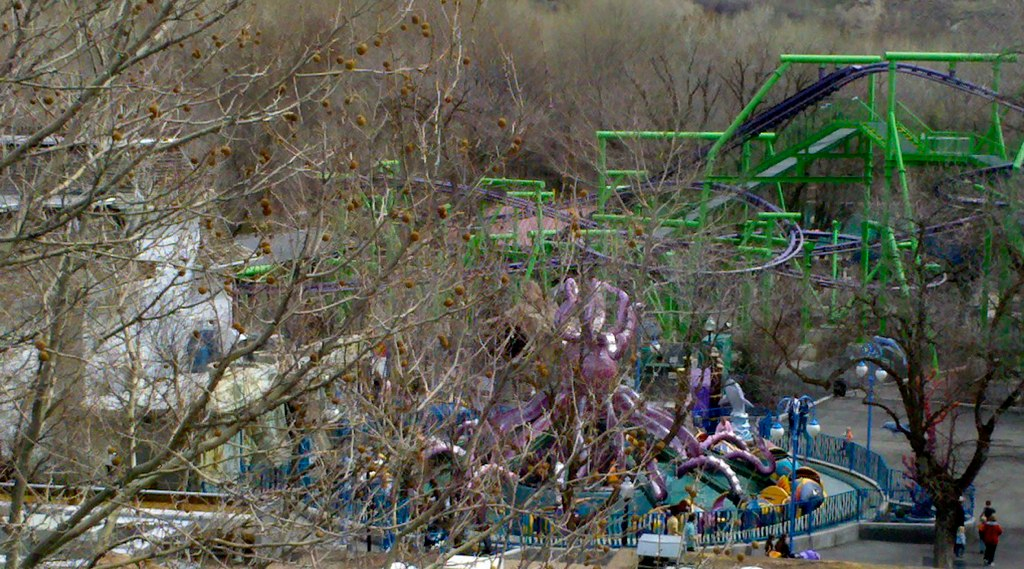
- The Bat in April 2010

Lagoon Amusement Park
- Location: Lagoon Amusement Park
- Coordinates: 40.986178°N 111.892638°W
- Status: Operating
- Opening date: April 16, 2005

General statistics
- Type: Steel – Inverted
- Manufacturer: Vekoma
- Model: Suspended Family Coaster (342m)
- Track layout: Inverted
- Height: 14.8 m (49 ft)
- Length: 342 m (1,122 ft)
- Inversions: 0
- Duration: 1:30 mins
- Capacity: 650 riders per hour
- G-force: 2.2
- Height restriction: 42 in (107 cm)
- Trains: Single train with 10 cars. Riders are arranged 2 across in a single row for a total of 20 riders per train.
- The Bat at RCDB

The Bat is a Vekoma suspended family coaster located at Lagoon Amusement Park in Farmington, Utah.

== History ==
The Bat debuted at Lagoon Amusement Park on April 16, 2005. Lagoon had hoped to open The Bat on the opening day of the 2005 season on April 9, but the opening was delayed a week. It was built on the site of the Lake Park Terrace, a pavilion moved to Lagoon from the park's original location on the shore of the Great Salt Lake. The pavilion was removed on October 12, 2004, to make room for the new roller coaster, as the structure's deterioration had passed the point of feasible maintenance. The Bat was one of four roller coasters added to Lagoon in a 10-year span, and the first at the park to use a magnetic braking system. The Bat was the third family-friendly ride, allowing both adult and child riders, to be installed in the park, following the Kontiki and Dragon Fly flat rides installed in 2004. The ride was also the first inverted roller coaster at the park, and it remains the only one in the present day.

== Ride description ==
The Bat begins with a turn out of the station and up a pinch wheel lift, into a series of helices and small hills around a "bat cave" and other themed features. The Bat comes to an end as the train is slowed by magnetic brakes and returns to the station. The minimum height for riders of The Bat is 42 inches (110 cm), a smaller minimum height restriction than most of the other roller coasters located in the park.

== Theme ==
The ride theming is based on bats. The ride façade and queue area resemble a cave with roosting bats, and the light coverings in the station area are decorated with images of bats. The ride track is painted purple with green supports, and the trains are black and purple with orange restraints. As of 2008, The Bat is the only roller coaster at Lagoon with over-the-shoulder restraints.
