= Sril Art =

American artist

Sril Art (Shae Petersen)
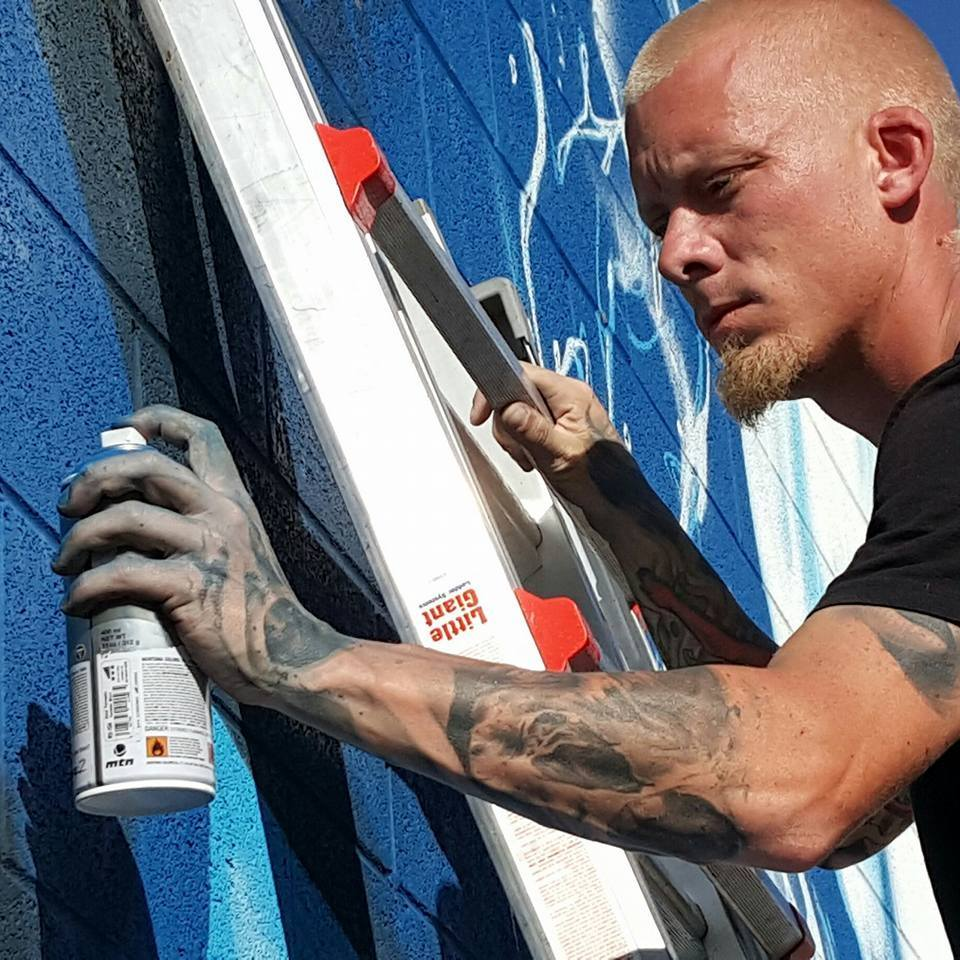
- Petersen at the installation of GODLIKE in Salt Lake City
- Born: February 11, 1984 (age 42); Salt Lake City, Utah, U.S.
- Known for: Mural art, graffiti
- Movement: Graffiti, mural
- Website: www.srilart.com

Shae Petersen (born February 11, 1984), also known as "Sril Art" or simply "Sril", is an American visual artist, muralist, and entrepreneur currently residing in Salt Lake City. He was the subject of an in-depth article in the periodical Salt Lake City Weekly. Petersen was the artist involved in the controversy over the creation of public art in South Salt Lake. Petersen is internationally recognized for his 100 ft mural titled "godlike", as well as murals depicting "Breaking Bad", Hunter S. Thompson, and Tech N9ne.

Sril has been commissioned by many notable clients, including Dan Bilzerian, Patagonia, Ricky Rubio, Reddit, BYU, and Joe Ingles.

His work has earned him the awards of Best Public Artist in 2014, 2015, and 2016, as well as Best Visual Artist in 2020. Additionally, his "Godlike" mural was the first ever mural to reach the #1 post on Reddit, and gained over 5 million views.

In 2018, Sril was commissioned to create Utah's largest mural to date, measuring 60 feet in height and 60 feet in width and beginning 15 feet from the ground.
