= Wicked (roller coaster) =

Roller coaster in Farmington, Utah

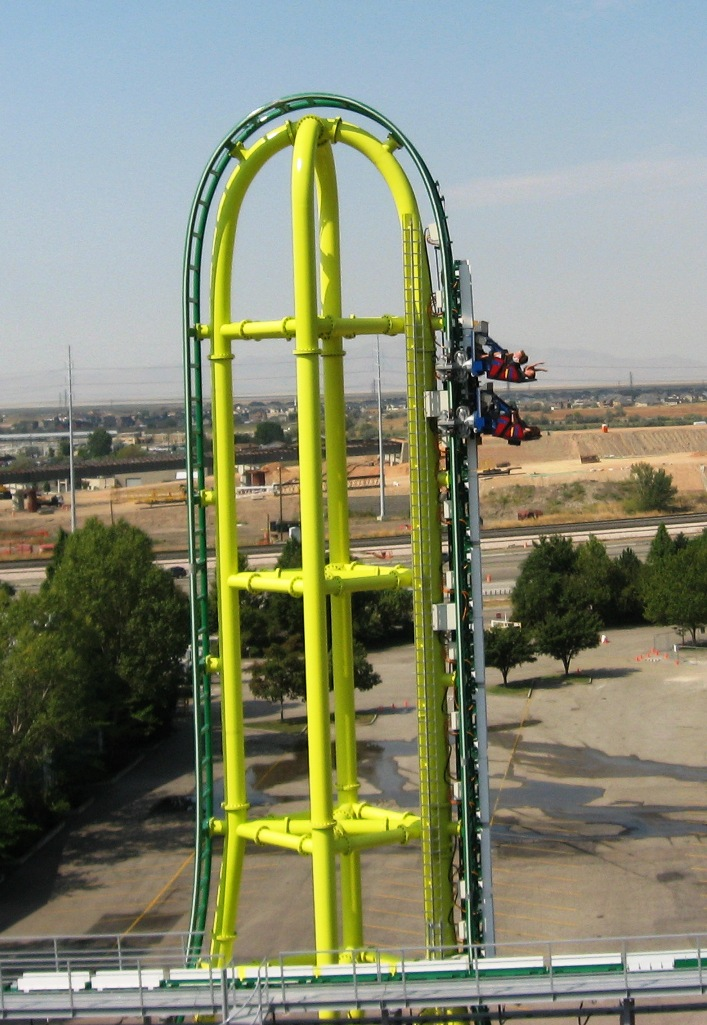
- Wicked's launch tower, September 2007

Lagoon Amusement Park
- Location: Lagoon Amusement Park
- Park section: South Midway
- Coordinates: 40°59′02″N 111°53′44″W
- Status: Operating
- Opening date: June 1, 2007
- Cost: $10 million

General statistics
- Type: Steel – Launched
- Manufacturer: Zierer
- Designer: Werner Stengel
- Model: Tower Launch Coaster
- Lift/launch system: Two LSM launches
- Height: 110 ft (34 m)
- Length: 2,050.5 ft (625.0 m)
- Speed: 55 mph (89 km/h)
- Inversions: 1
- Duration: 1:46
- Max vertical angle: 90°
- Capacity: 900 riders per hour
- G-force: 4.8
- Height restriction: 46 in (117 cm)
- Trains: 6 trains with a single car; riders arranged 4 across in 2 rows for a total of 8 riders per train
- Wicked at RCDB

Wicked is a Zierer steel launched roller coaster located at Lagoon Amusement Park in Farmington, Utah. Designed by Werner Stengel, the ride was manufactured by Zierer at a cost of $10 million and opened to the public in 2007. It features a zero-g roll inversion and two linear synchronous motor (LSM) launches, reaching a maximum speed of 55 mph (89 km/h).

== History ==
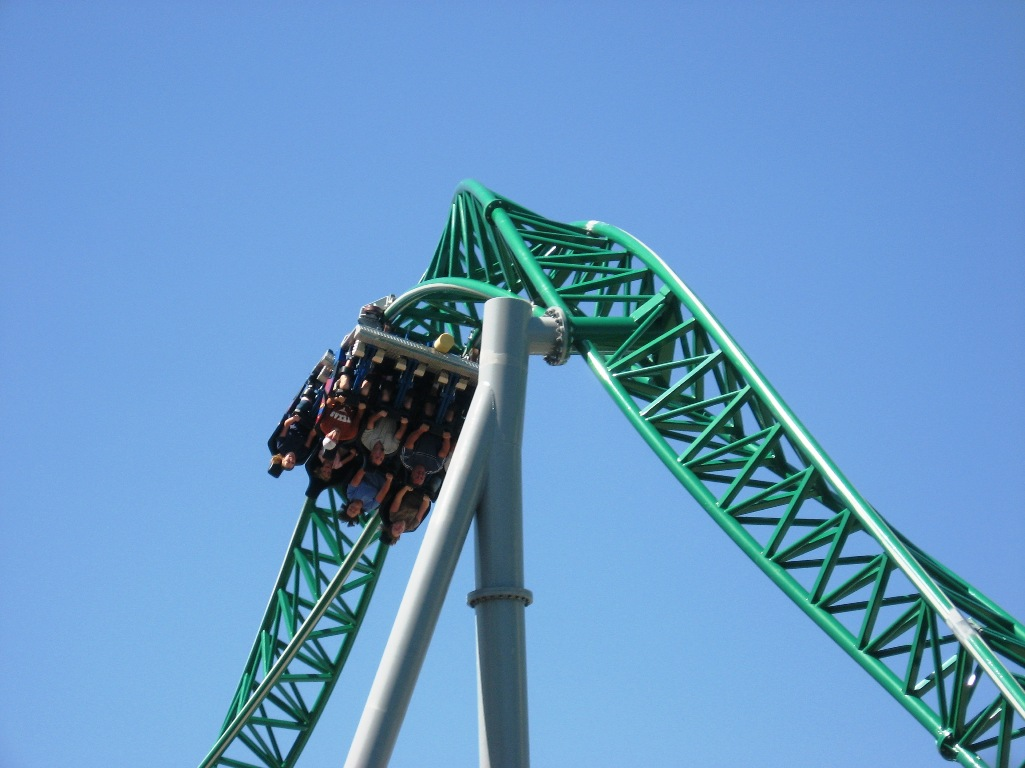
Wicked's zero-g inversion in 2007

Construction of the attraction began in August 2006. Wicked was designed by Werner Stengel and manufactured by Zierer, with fabrication subcontracted to Stakotra Manufacturing. The total cost to construct the ride was $10 million, and it opened to the public on June 1, 2007. The ride has been described as "very smooth" and "lack[ing] any jerking or shaking" by Deseret News, which also noted that riders were secured unusually by their ankles and thighs, instead of traditional shoulder or lap restraints.

Wicked is located in the south midway of the park, in an area previously used for parking. Its track is a teal green, and it has silver supports. The supports of the launch tower are yellow.

== Ride experience ==
The train leaves the station and immediately enters a dark tunnel. A siren and loud booming sound effect can be heard before the linear synchronous motor (LSM) launches the train straight up the 110-foot (34 m) vertical launch hill at 41 mph (66 km/h). The launch is in two parts, with a short boost launch inside the tunnel and a longer, vertical launch straight up the top hat element. After cresting, it descends vertically down the other side of the top hat element, accelerating to a maximum speed of 55 mph (89 km/h). This is followed by a small airtime hill with a trim brake and a whip around an Immelmann turn. The track levels out before sending riders up into a zero-g roll, followed by a short descent into a shallow turn. The train descends into a double half-pipe, twists right then left, and proceeds into a downward helix that twists back to the left. The train dips into a tunnel before lifting and leveling out into the final brake run. Every so often, a launched train will fail to make it over the apex of the tower. At this time, the emergency brakes will deploy and the car will enter a slowed descent back into the launch tunnel. The ride was engineered with incidents like this in mind, so it can be easily reset and relaunched at a greater speed, ensuring that the train will make it over the crest of the hill.
