= BomBora (Lagoon) =

Family steel roller coaster in Utah

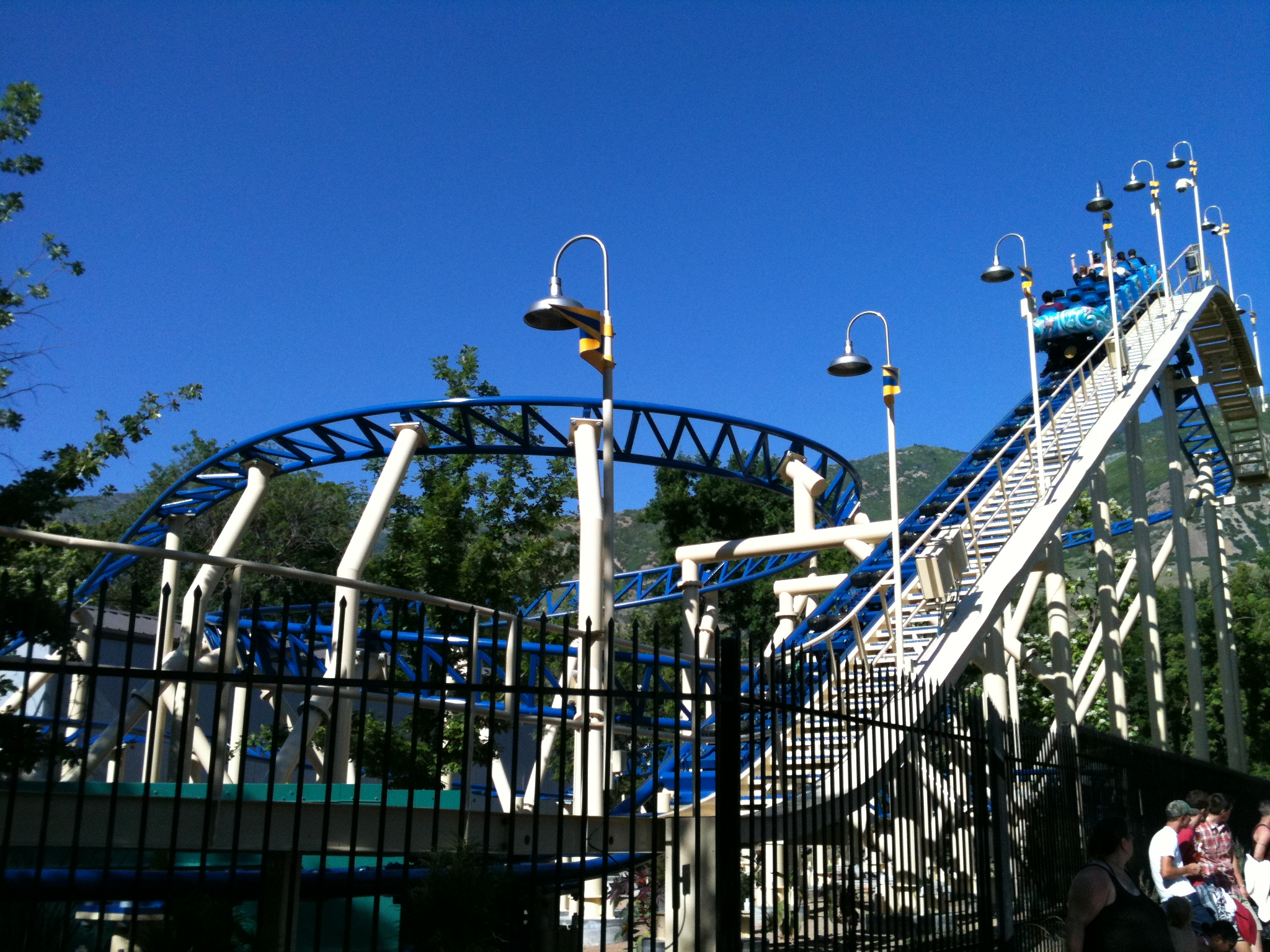
- BomBora, as viewed from the exit of Lagoon-A-Beach, July 2011

Lagoon
- Location: Lagoon
- Park section: Kiddie Land
- Coordinates: 40.9855°N 111.8923°W
- Status: Operating
- Opening date: April 2, 2011

General statistics
- Type: Steel
- Manufacturer: Lagoon
- Designer: ART Engineering
- Height: 45 ft (14 m)
- Length: 1,040 ft (320 m)
- Speed: 31 mph (50 km/h)
- Height restriction: 36 in (91 cm)
- Trains: 2 trains with 8 cars. Riders are arranged 2 across in a single row for a total of 16 riders per train.
- Website: www.lagoonpark.com/ride/bombora/
- BomBora at RCDB

BomBora is a family steel roller coaster currently operating at Lagoon in Farmington, Utah. It is located just outside Lagoon-A-Beach, Lagoon's water park. The name of the coaster comes from an indigenous Australian term for "a submerged reef" or "a turbulent area of sea over such a reef."

== History ==
Construction started in 2010, after lockers for Lagoon-A-Beach were demolished. The roller coaster opened in 2011.

== Ride experience ==
The ride starts with a left turn out of the station and into the lift hill. At the top of the lift hill, riders fall down the highest drop in the ride and enter a series of drops and twists, while surf rock music plays, before reaching the final brake run and returning to the station.
