= Cannibal (roller coaster) =

Roller coaster in Utah

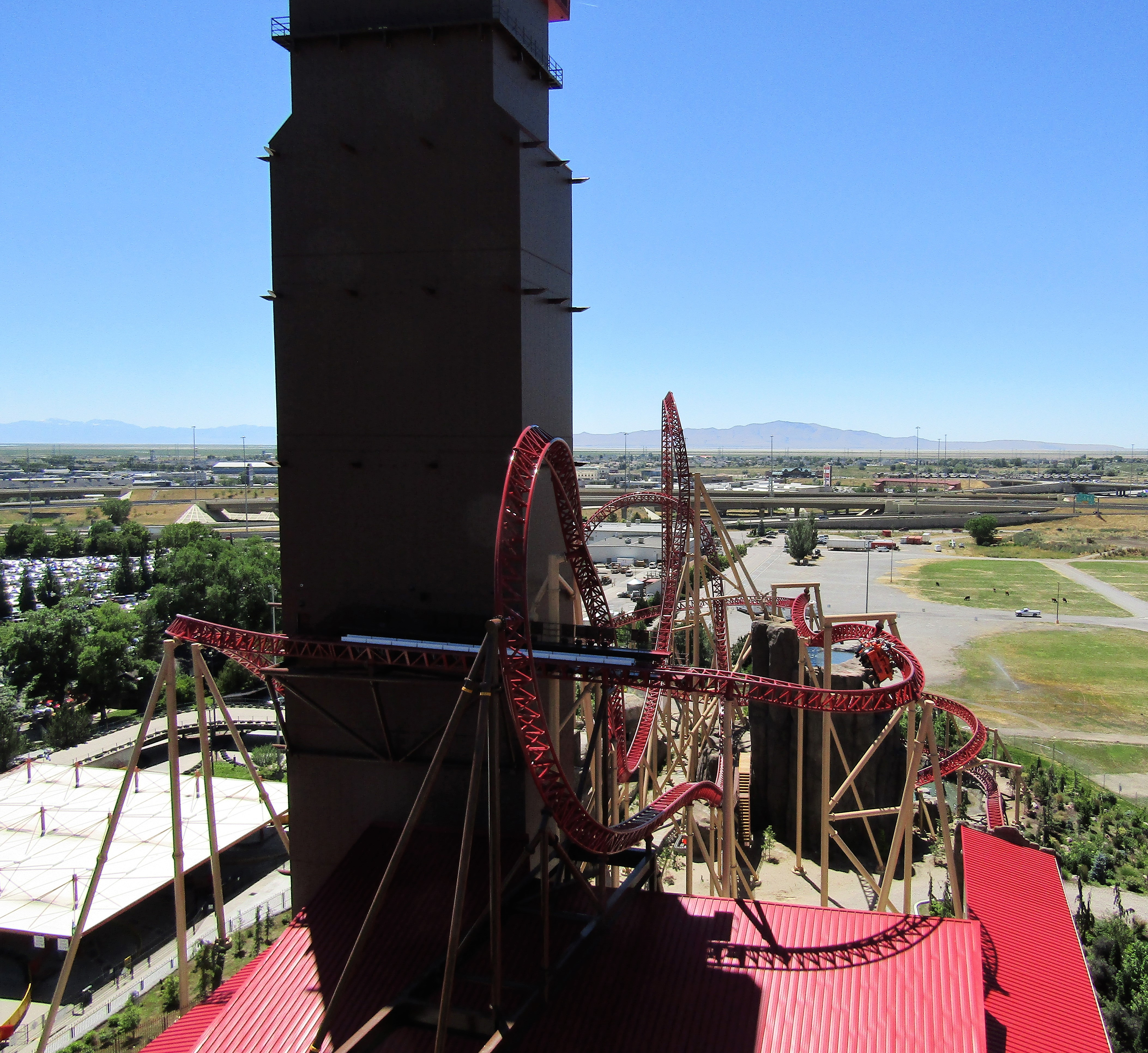
- Aerial view of Cannibal

Lagoon
- Location: Lagoon
- Park section: North Midway
- Coordinates: 40.987396°N 111.895546°W
- Status: Operating
- Opening date: July 2, 2015
- Cost: $22 million

General statistics
- Type: Steel
- Manufacturer: Lagoon Corporation
- Designer: Dal Freeman
- Height: 197 ft (60 m)
- Length: 2,735 ft (834 m)
- Speed: 70 mph (110 km/h)
- Inversions: 4
- Duration: 2:30
- Max vertical angle: 116°
- G-force: 4.2
- Height restriction: 48 in (122 cm)
- Trains: 7 trains with a single car; riders arranged 4 across in 3 rows for a total of 12 riders per train
- Website: www.lagoonpark.com/ride/cannibal/
- Cannibal at RCDB

Cannibal is a steel roller coaster located at Lagoon in Farmington, Utah. It opened with the tallest beyond-vertical drop in the world on July 2, 2015, and its drop angle of 116 degrees was the steepest in the United States for a brief time. A large portion of the $22-million ride was built and designed in-house. Cannibal also ranked in the top 50 among steel roller coasters worldwide in the annual Golden Ticket Awards publication from Amusement Today for several years.

== History ==
Nearly 75% of Cannibal was designed, engineered, and manufactured in-house by Lagoon with the help of multiple firms located in Utah. The lead designer was Lagoon's Dal Freeman. In an era when most amusement parks outsource the work to a select few established roller coaster manufacturers, the decision to build in-house is rare in the industry. The roller coaster features a 208-foot-tall (63 m) enclosed elevator lift, a beyond-vertical drop of 116 degrees, a themed underground tunnel, and a 360-degree helix situated above a man-made waterfall. It also features four inversions that include a 140-foot-tall (43 m) Immelman loop, a dive loop, and a unique inversion the park calls the "Lagoon roll", which consists of a counter-clockwise heartline roll immediately followed by a clockwise heartline roll. The trains, which use only lap bar restraints, travel up to 70 miles per hour (110 km/h) and pull as much as 4.2 G's.

The ride had been in the planning stages for more than five years and required more than two years to construct. Prior to its planned opening in the spring of 2015, Lagoon announced that the roller coaster's debut would be postponed for additional testing and inspections. The ride officially opened on July 2, 2015. At the time of opening, Cannibal set a world record for the tallest beyond-vertical drop among roller coasters, and became the steepest in the United States. Its drop angle record in the US was surpassed by TMNT Shellraiser, which opened at Nickelodeon Universe in 2019.

== Ride experience ==
The roller coaster features a 197 feet (60 m) elevator lift, enclosed in a huge tower structure; a 116° beyond vertical drop; inversions, including an Immelman, as well as an inversion called a Lagoon roll, consisting of two consecutive heartline rolls in opposite directions; a water feature; and a tunnel 20 feet (6.1 m) underground. It is the tallest roller coaster in the state and the longest ride in the park. The ride cars accommodate twelve passengers in three rows of four, and the duration of the ride lasts approximately two and a half minutes.

== Reception ==
The ride appeared in Amusement Today's Golden Ticket Awards for the first time in 2016, ranking 42nd among steel roller coasters.

Golden Ticket Awards: Top steel Roller Coasters
Year									1998	1999
Ranking									–	–
Year	2000	2001	2002	2003	2004	2005	2006	2007	2008	2009
Ranking	–	–	–	–	–	–	–	–	–	–
Year	2010	2011	2012	2013	2014	2015	2016	2017	2018	2019
Ranking	–	–	–	–	–	–	42	32	44	41
Year	2020	2021	2022	2023	2024	2025				
Ranking	N/A	48 (tied)	–	–	–	–				
