= The Wild Animal Sanctuary =

Zoo in Keenesburg, Colorado, United States

- The Wild Animal Sanctuary logo

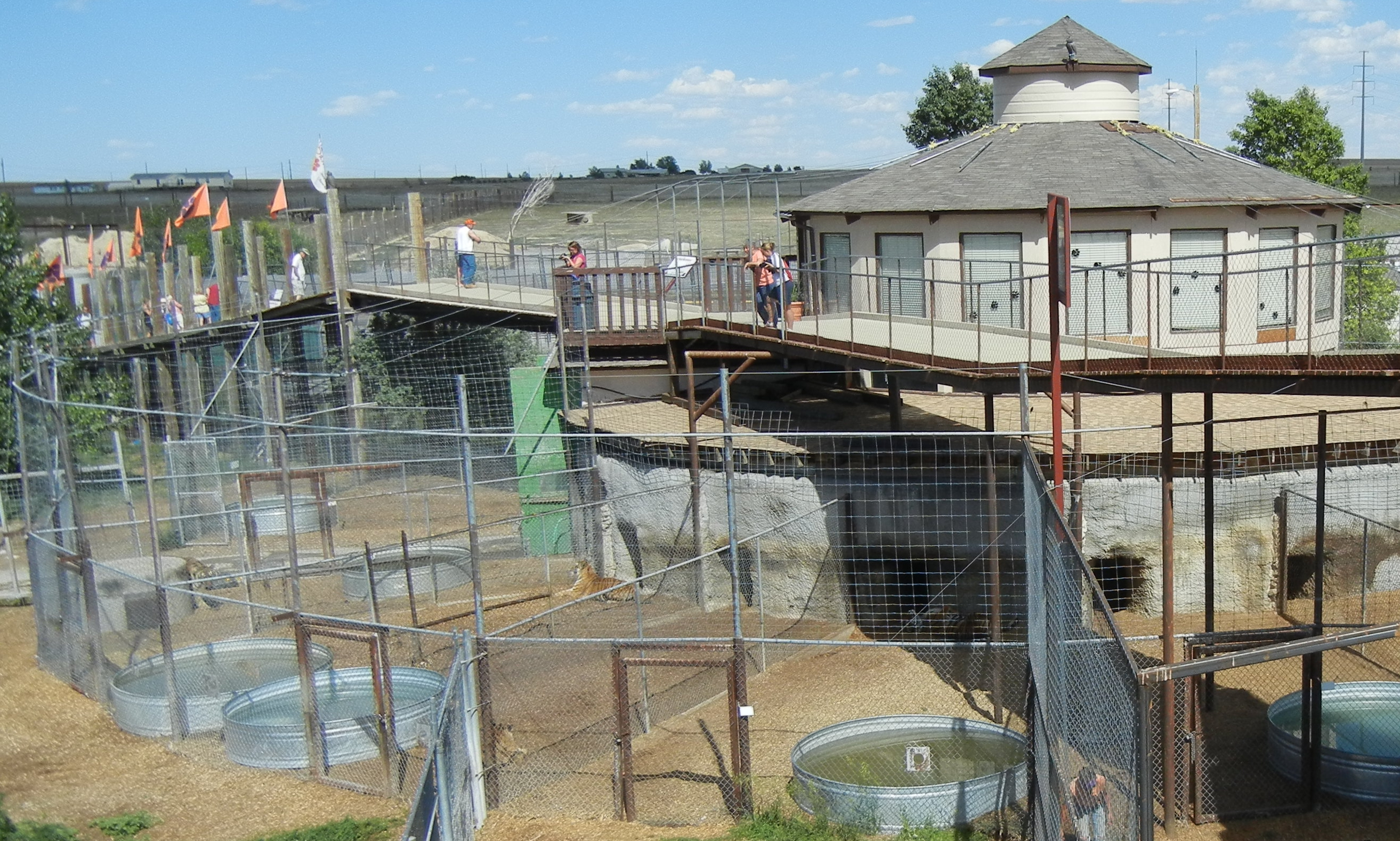
- Central receiving compound with upper level education center
- Interactive map of The Wild Animal Sanctuary
- 40.028173°N 104.559760°W
- Date opened: January 10, 1980
- Location: Keenesburg, Colorado, United States
- Land area: 9,793 acres (3,963 ha)
- No. of animals: 460+
- No. of species: ~18
- Annual visitors: almost 200,000 (2013)
- Memberships: 192
- Website: www.wildanimalsanctuary.org

The Wild Animal Sanctuary is a 33,000-acre (13,000 ha) animal sanctuary in Keenesburg, Colorado, United States. The sanctuary specializes in rescuing and caring for large predators which are being ill-treated, for which their owners can no longer care, or which might otherwise be euthanized. It is a 501(c)(3) nonprofit organization and a state and federally licensed zoological facility.

Created in 1980, The Wild Animal Sanctuary is situated on grassland northeast of Denver, and has helped over 1,000 animals since it first opened. By early 2022, home to more than 550 animals, and 192 staff and volunteers to take care, the group announced the purchase of a major addition, a 9,004-acre ranch near Springfield, Colorado.

== Mission ==
The stated mission of the sanctuary is "to rescue captive large Carnivores who have been abused, abandoned, illegally kept or exploited; to create for them a wonderful life for as long as they live; and to educate about the causes and solutions to the Captive Wildlife Crisis." The sanctuary states that there are many large carnivores living outside the zoo system in the United States, including 4000 or so tigers living as pets in Texas alone, and many of these come from the black market trade in exotic animals.

== History ==
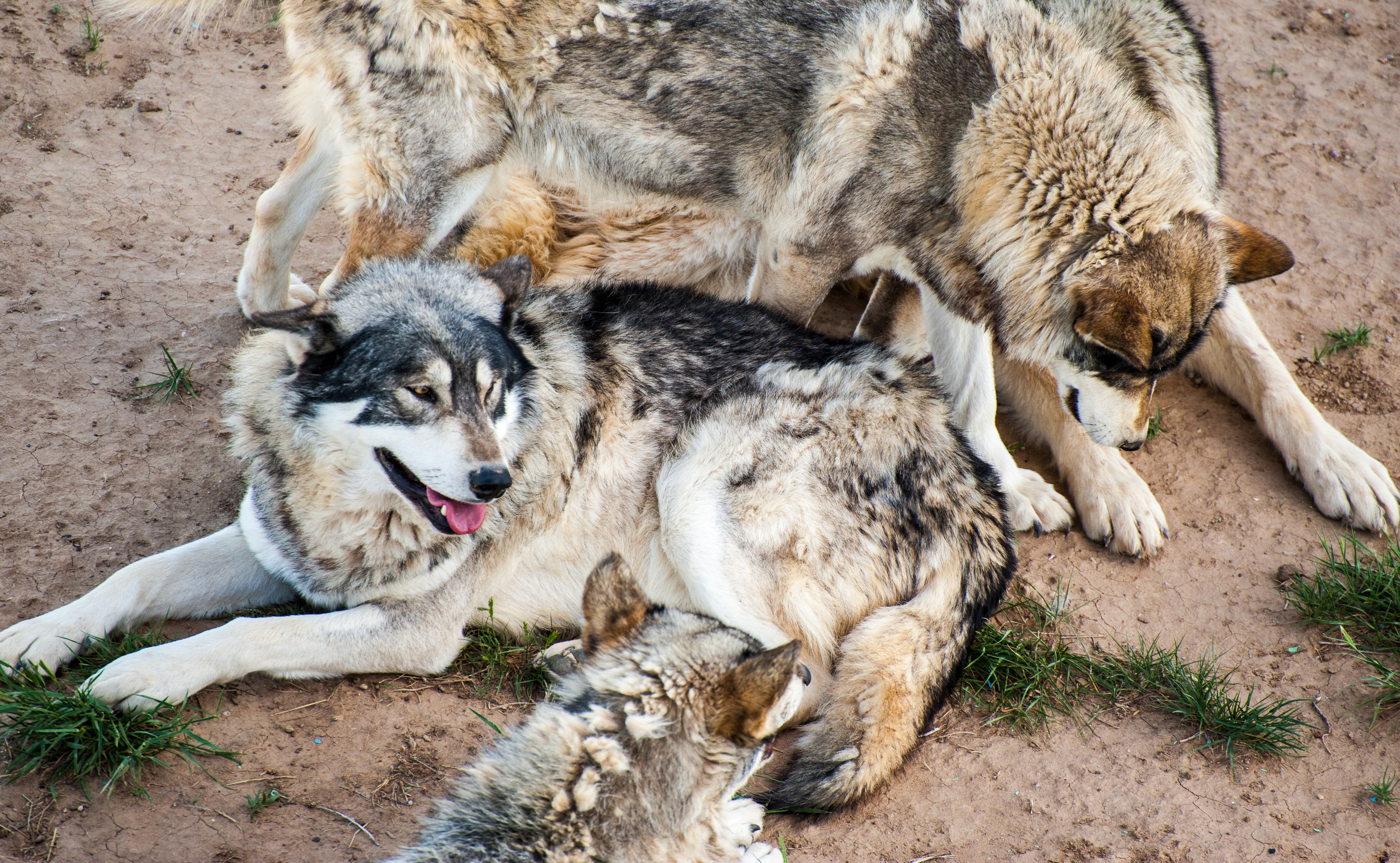
Timberwolves as seen from the walkway

Pat Craig started The Wild Animal Sanctuary when he took in a jaguar cub that he kept on a licensed facility on his family's farm outside Boulder, Colorado. The animals were soon moved to Lyons, Colorado to provide additional space. After 8 years in Lyons, a limestone quarry was opened nearby, forcing the sanctuary to move.

In 2005, largely because of relief efforts for Hurricane Katrina and the Indonesia tsunami, donations to the sanctuary decreased significantly, and by mid-2006 the staff thought the sanctuary would need to close. In order to help raise money, the sanctuary was opened to the public, started selling donated merchandise, brought in more volunteers, and started a program of sponsoring individual animals.

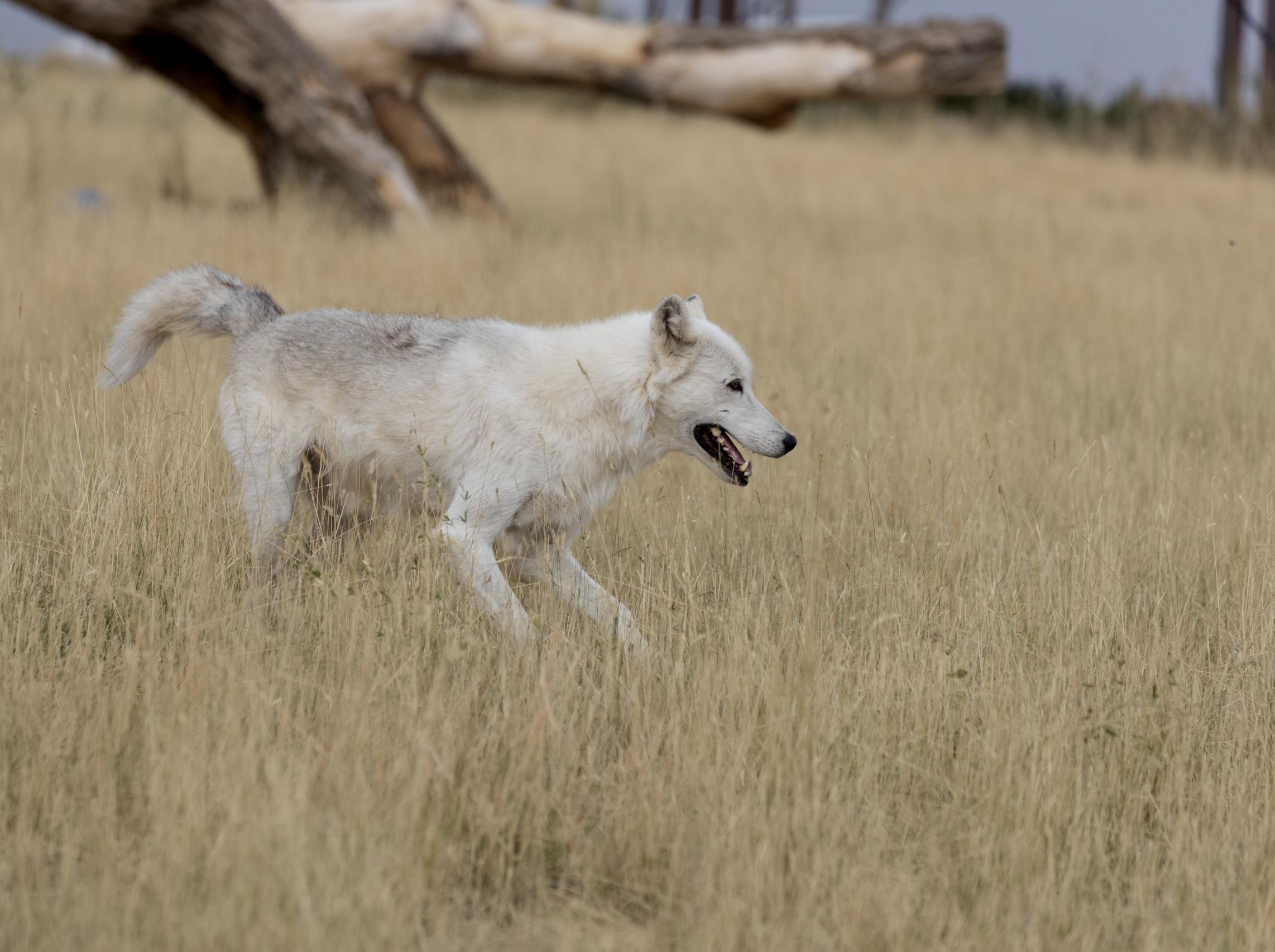
Continued expansion of the sanctuary has allowed for more areas for animals to roam.

By 2007 the sanctuary was using 160 acres (65 ha) of its 320-acre (130 ha) site for rescued animal habitats. By 2010 it had 240 acres (97 ha) of habitats.

In February 2011, the sanctuary, in cooperation with Animal Defenders International, Bob Barker, and the Bolivian government (which had recently enacted legislation outlawing performing wild animals), received 25 lions from circuses in Bolivia that had typically housed the lions in crates for transport. The sanctuary built a fabric covered structure isolated from the main facility to house the lions while they got acclimated to the Colorado climate, and while four 20-acre (8.1 ha) outdoor enclosures were being prepared. The first of the prides, picked because they "appear to be close-knit and familiar with each other", was first allowed access to their large outdoor habitat on April 14, 2011.

The additional 80 acres (32 ha) of enclosures created for the Bolivian lions took up the remainder of the existing sanctuary property, but later in 2011, a donation allowed the sanctuary to purchase another 400 acres (160 ha), expanding the site to 720 acres (290 ha) and providing space for future expansion of the habitats.

In May 2012 the sanctuary completed the "Mile Into the Wild" walkway. This 4,800-foot (1,500 m) walkway has let visitors view and photograph the animals in their large habitat areas from above, and at the time connected the original holding area and education building with the Bolivian Lion House and a new parking lot that was built for the increasing number of visitors. In addition, the county paved the road to the sanctuary, making access easier.

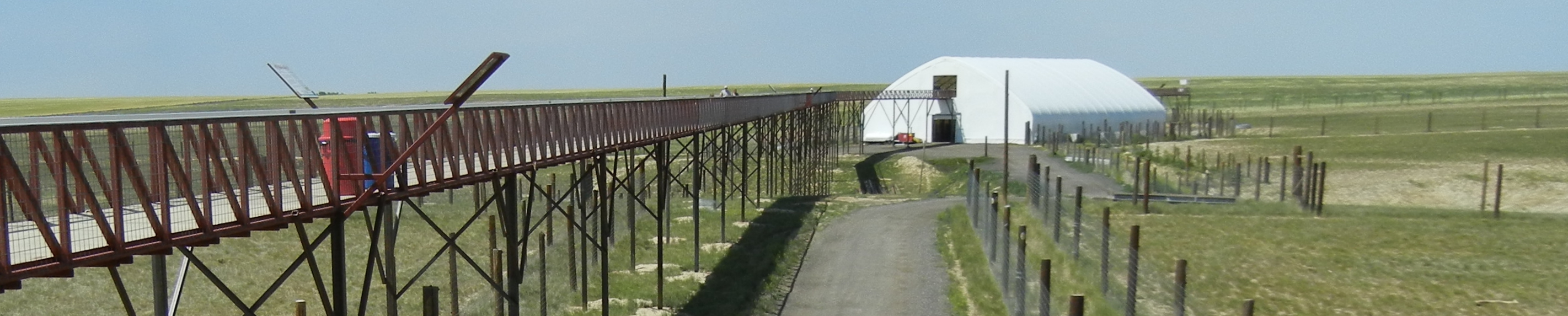
Mile Into the Wild walkway approaching the Bolivian Lion House

== Facilities ==
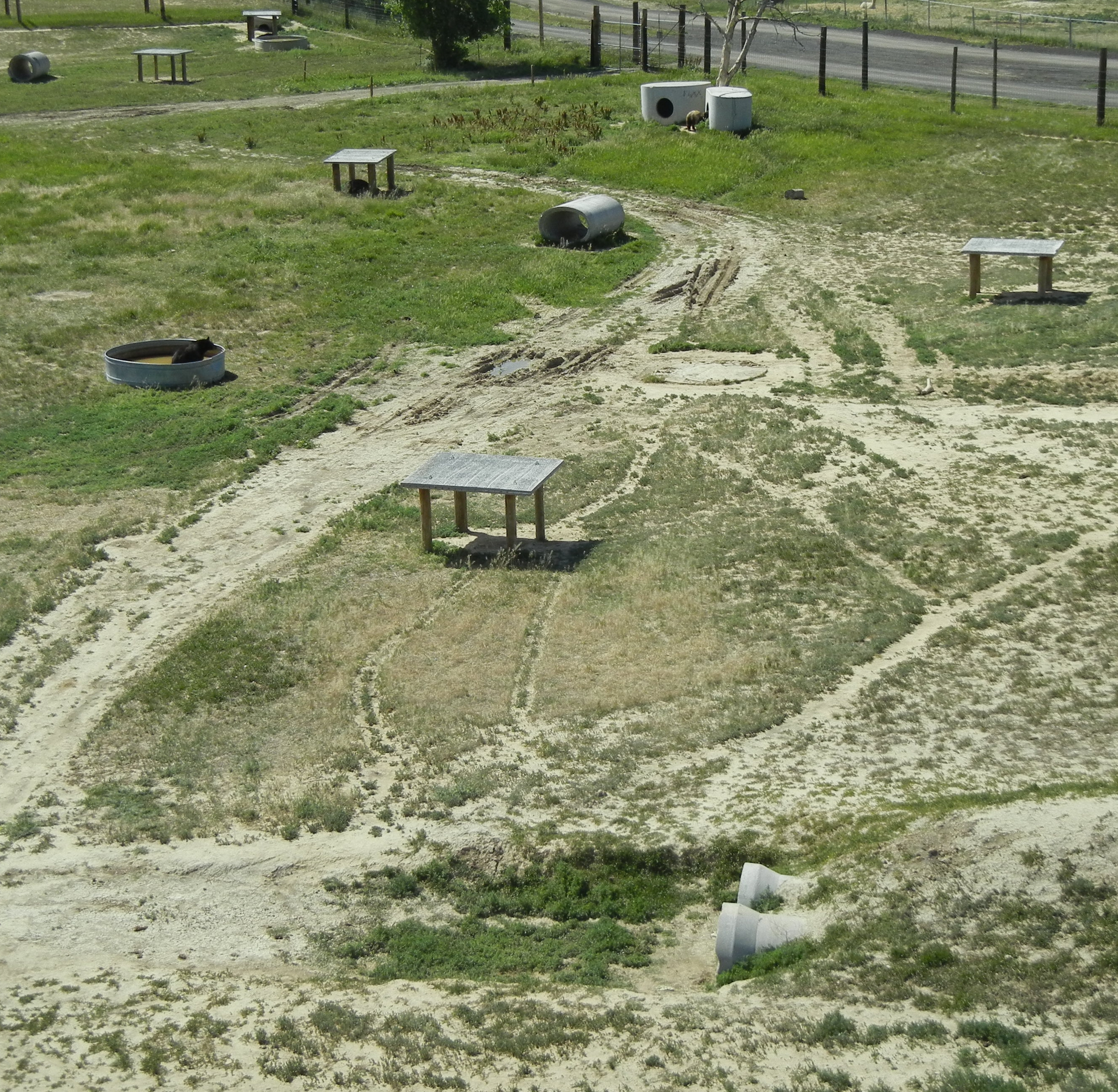
Bear enclosure with shade structures, water tank, and "dens" in the foreground

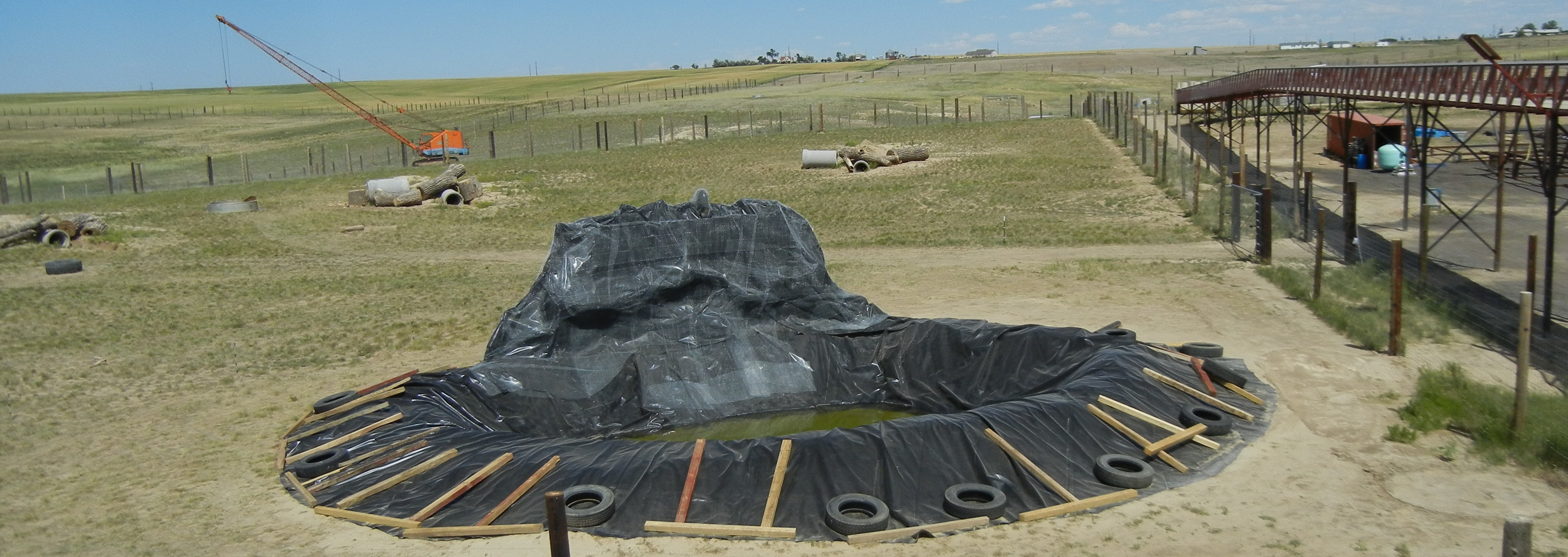
Water feature under construction in 2012

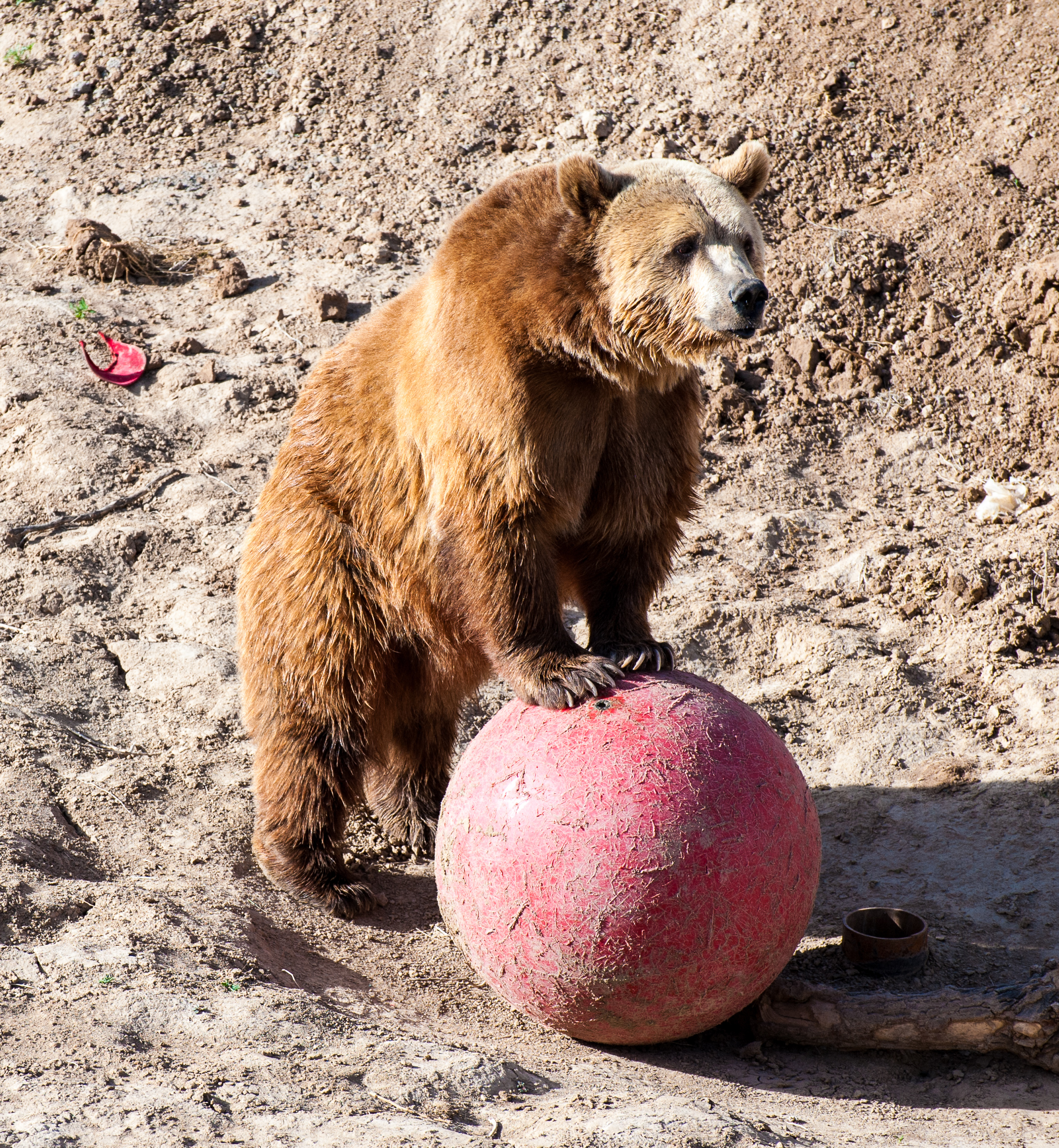
Grizzly bear with an enrichment device.

The sanctuary aims to eventually get all of their animals into large acreage habitats. It designed with a central compound for receiving new animals and starting their recuperation and acclimation into these larger habitats. The lower floor of the main compound houses tigers, and the upper floor is an education center. The animals in this area have indoor/outdoor enclosures with play structures, and heated areas for the winter. The common pool area where tigers can take turns playing includes a waterfall.

As of 2013, the sanctuary had 26 species-specific habitats of 5–25 acres (2–10 ha) each that are home to over 330 African lions, tigers, bears, leopards, cougars, timberwolves and other large carnivores. Habitats include pools for swimming and underground dens that stay at a constant temperature year round. Visitors can view these animals in their natural habitats from elevated walkways accessed from the education center.

In the summer of 2016 a new 48,000 square foot welcome center was opened and an additional 1/2-mile of elevated walkway was added. On October 31, 2016, Guinness World Records certified that the Wild Animal Sanctuary's elevated walkway was the world's longest footbridge at 7,974 feet (2,430 m), supplanting the Poughkeepsie Railroad Bridge.

In spring 2018, with the Keenesburg site deemed at capacity, and no local expansion options, partly due to expanding oil and gas operations, the sanctuary announced the purchase of an additional property of 9,004 acres in the southeastern part of the state. The new $7M property, dubbed "The Wild Animal Refuge", is between the towns of La Junta and Springfield, mainly in Baca County, the rest in Las Animas County. In contrast to the plains of Keenesburg, the new location has a variety of wild terrain, including pine forest, canyons, caves and rocky areas. As of January 2022, the sanctuary has constructed more than 30 large acreage habitats at the Refuge and currently cares for more than 150 rescued Lions, Tigers, Bears, Wolves and other animals there. The Refuge is not open to the public due to its remote location; the Keenesburg location will remain the public education and outreach center. To help pay for the new property, the sanctuary launched the Founder Program to offer various incentives for new donations.

In 2020, the AZA-accredited International Exotic Animal Sanctuary in Boyd, Texas joined the Wild Animal Sanctuary network when their owner retired. The International Exotic Animal Sanctuary was subsequently renamed "The Wild Animal Sanctuary-Texas". In 2024, the Texas facility closed and moved its remaining animals to Colorado.

In 2022 the sanctuary was able to pay off the $7M Refuge property through its Founder Program and funds derived through a Conservation Easement. The sanctuary also became involved with the Bureau of Land Management's (BLM) efforts to round up wild horses in northwest Colorado by responding to supporters requests for help. The sanctuary began to adopt many of the captured horse in order to protect their freedom and provide them with vast spaces to roam at their Springfield, CO facility. At the same time, the sanctuary began a state-wide search for property large enough to provide refuge to much larger number of wild horses, which are also known as Mustangs. By the end of 2022, the sanctuary had more than 30 rescued wild horses roaming freely at the Wild Animal Refuge, and was under contract to purchase a former 22,500-acre cattle ranch located near Craig, Colorado.

In January 2023, the sanctuary completed the 22,500-acre purchase and began preparing the property to house upwards of 500 rescued horses. Plans include allowing rescued mustangs to roam freely with little human interaction and to implement a similar Founder Program to help pay for the new purchase. Horses began populating the property in May 2023.

In 2007 it was estimated that 25,000 or more wild animals were living in captivity outside the zoo system in the United States. Many of these are mistreated or abused, and many are being kept illegally. The Wild Animal Sanctuary believes that education about these animals is critical to informing the public and helping to provide better conditions for the animals. The visitor center at the sanctuary provides information about these animals, and the sanctuary has speakers who do presentations for a variety of organizations.
