= Maha Music Festival =

Annual music festival in Omaha, Nebraska, U.S.

Coordinates: 41°14′17″N 96°00′53″W

Maha Festival
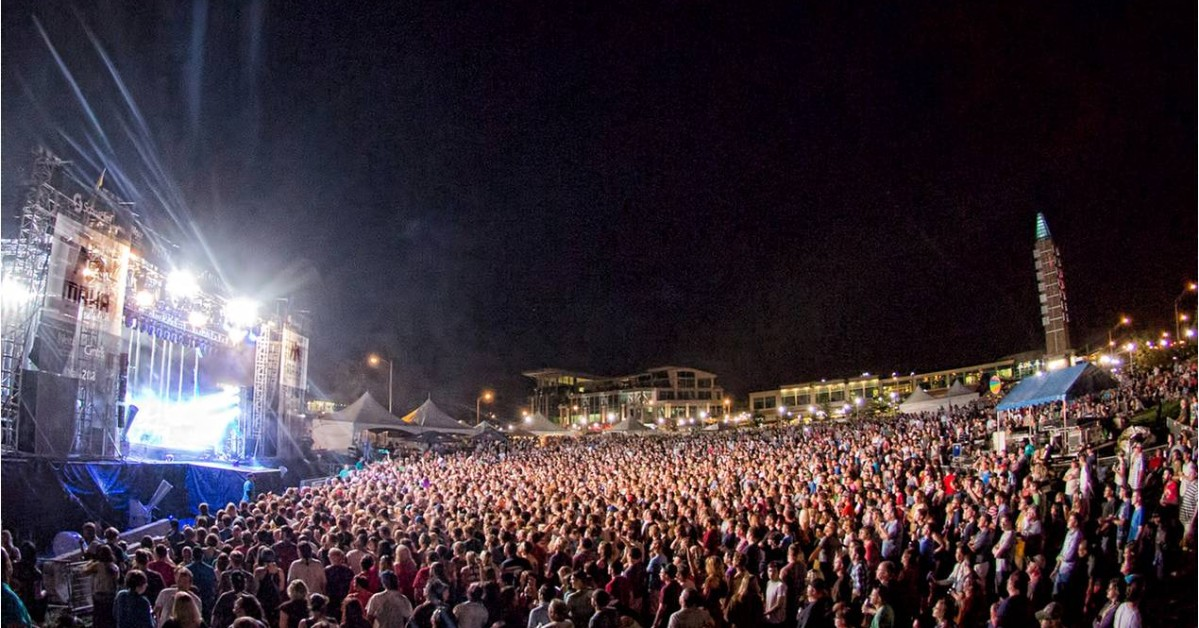
- Maha in 2013
- Genre: Rock, indie, hip hop, electronic
- Dates: July 28–29, 2023
- Locations: Stinson Park at Aksarben Village, Omaha, Nebraska, United States
- Years active: 2009–present
- Website: www.mahafestival.com

The Maha Festival (known until 2021 as Maha Music Festival) is an independent music festival held in Omaha, Nebraska, United States. The festival is owned and operated by YFC, Inc., a non-profit organization.

== Upcoming ==
=== 2025 ===
The 16th edition of the Maha Festival is scheduled to take place on Saturday, August 2, 2025, at the newly renovated Heartland of America Park. This will mark the festival's return to downtown Omaha's RiverFront for the first time since the 2010 festival; the festival had relocated from the RiverFront due to the Missouri River flooding in summer 2011. Maha is welcoming back its original founders, Mike App, Tre Brashear, Tyler Owen, and Mike Toohey. The founding foursome had started the newer Outlandia Music Festival in Bellevue back in 2022, but cited they would end Outlandia going forward to focus on Maha. 1% Productions is contracted to produce the event.

Announced acts include headliner Pixies as well as Waxahatchee, Band of Horses, Magdalena Bay, Silversun Pickups, and local act Little Brazil.

== Past festivals ==
=== 2009 ===
The inaugural Maha Music Festival was held on Saturday, August 29, 2009, at Lewis & Clark Landing. The lineup was headlined by Dashboard Confessional and G. Love & Special Sauce, and included Big Head Todd and the Monsters, Serena Ryder, Army Navy and The Appleseed Cast. Four Omaha area bands were featured on a local stage at the festival: Jes Winter Band, Noah's Ark Was A Spaceship, Little Brazil and It's True. Corporate financial support for the festival was provided by Alegent Health, Brashear LLP, State Farm Insurance, McCarthy Capital Corporation, Stinson Morrison Hecker LLP, and The Kind World Foundation.

MAHA Stage	Brashear LLP Stage
Dashboard Confessional; G. Love & Special Sauce; Big Head Todd and the Monsters; Serena Ryder; Army Navy; The Appleseed Cast	Jes Winter Band; Noah's Ark Was a Spaceship; Little Brazil; It's True

=== 2010 ===
In 2010, Maha was held on Saturday, July 24, 2010, at Lewis & Clark Landing and featured headliners Spoon and The Faint, as well as supporting acts Superchunk, Old 97's, Ben Kweller and It's True. Headlining the "local stage" were Satchel Grande and The Mynabirds from the Saddle Creek Records label. Other artists performing on the local stage were Landing On The Moon, Betsy Wells and Voodoo Method. From the announcement of the lineup to reviews of the show itself, MAHA 2010 was universally praised. Such praise culminated in the event being selected as the "Best Outdoor Festival" in Omaha, ahead of some well-established local events.

In 2010, the Presenting Sponsor of Maha remained Alegent Health, while the main and local stages were sponsored by TD Ameritrade and Kum & Go, respectively.

TD Ameritrade Stage	Kum & Go Stage
Spoon; The Faint; Superchunk; Old 97's; Ben Kweller; It's True	Satchel Grande; The Mynabirds; Landing On the Moon; Betsy Wells; Voodoo Method

=== 2011 ===
The third annual Maha Music Festival was relocated from Lewis & Clark Landing to Stinson Park at Aksarben Village due to flooding. It was also rescheduled from the third weekend in July to August 13, because of a time conflict with the inaugural Red Sky Music Festival. Guided by Voices and Matisyahu headlined the festival; Cursive, J Mascis, The Reverend Horton Heat, and The Envy Corps filled out the rest of the national stage line-up. The local stage featured Omaha bands The So-So Sailors and Noah's Ark was a Spaceship], and Lincoln bands The Machete Archive and Somasphere. This year, voters cast ballots at the Omaha Entertainment and Arts Awards Summer Showcase to pick the opening local act, with the opening slot going to Omaha band The Big Deep. An estimated 4,000 people attended the festival. TD Ameritrade and Kum & Go sponsored the main and local stages, respectively, for the second year in a row. Other sponsors included Weitz Funds, McCarthy Capital, Lucky Bucket Brewers, Proxibid, Centris Federal Credit Union, Whole Foods, Alegent Health, Broadmoor at Aksarben Village, HDR Architecture, Walnut Private Equity, Stinson Morrison Hecker LLP, and Blue Cross Blue Shield of Nebraska.

TD Ameritrade Stage	Kum & Go Stage
Guided by Voices; Matisyahu; Cursive; J Mascis; The Reverend Horton Heat; The Envy Corps	Somasphere; Noah's Ark Was a Spaceship; The So-So Sailors; The Machete Archive; The Big Deep

=== 2012 ===
The fourth annual Maha Music Festival was held Saturday, August 11, 2012, at Stinson Park at Aksarben Village. Headlining artists included 90s alt-rockers Garbage and the reunited Desaparecidos. Rounding out the lineup were Delta Spirit, Dum Dum Girls, Josh Rouse, Frontier Ruckus, and Conduits. The local stage featured Omaha bands The Seen, Icky Blossoms, The Mynabirds, and Lincoln bands UUVVWWZ, Universe Contest, and Eli Mardock.

2012 Sponsors included Weitz Funds, Proxibid, Alegent Health, McCarthy Capital, DiVentures, Stinson Morrison Hecker, Walnut Private Equity, Douglas County, HDR, SilverStone Group, Oxide Design Co., BlueCross BlueShield of Nebraska, The Bank of New York Mellon, Lucky Bucket Brewing Company, HearNebraska.org, KIWR, KRNU, The Reader, Pabst Blue Ribbon, Absolut and Bacardi.

Attendance exceeded 4,300, which made it the largest Maha to date.

Weitz Stage	Centris Stage
Desaparecidos; Garbage; Delta Spirit; Dum Dum Girls; Josh Rouse; Frontier Ruckus; Conduits	Icky Blossoms; The Mynabirds; UUVVWWZ; Universe Contest; Eli Mardock; The Seen

=== 2013 ===
Maha returned to Stinson Park for the fifth version of the festival on August 17, 2013. Oklahoma City psychedelic rock band The Flaming Lips served as the headliner, and were joined on the diverse Weitz Management Main Stage by Brooklyn indie pop duo Matt and Kim, former Hüsker Dü and Sugar bandleader Bob Mould, Portland indie rockers The Thermals, San Francisco's Thao & The Get Down Stay Down, Texas folk rockers Sons of Fathers, and local favorite Millions of Boys. The Centris Stage featured Digital Leather along with local bands Criteria, The Millions, Rock Paper Dynamite, Hers with Omaha Girls Rock! and Purveyors of the Conscious Sound, who won The Omaha Entertainment and Arts Awards Showcase to earn the opening lineup spot.

2013 Sponsors include Schnackel Engineers Inc., Weitz Funds, Centris Federal Credit Union, Alegent Creighton Health, Corporate Ventures, TD Ameritrade, DiVentures, Stinson Morrison Hecker, SilverStone Group, Walnut Private Equity, BNY Mellon Wealth Management, Douglas County, Oxide Design Co., 1% Productions, Insurance Planning Associates, HearNebraska.org, Ink Tank, The Waiting Room, Pabst Blue Ribbon, Absolut, Jack Daniel's, Mike's Hard Lemonade and Bacardi.

Promotional tattoos were offered again in 2013, using the same blackbird logo as the previous year. Attendance was over 5,100, once again becoming the largest Maha crowd to date.

This was the first time the festival featured The Globe, a spoken word tent, featuring live comedy and poetry from local and national acts.

Weitz Stage	Centris Stage	The Globe
The Flaming Lips; Matt & Kim; Bob Mould; The Thermals; Thao & The Get Down Stay Down; Sons of Fathers; Millions of Boys	Digital Leather; Criteria; The Millions; Rock Paper Dynamite; HERS with Omaha Girls Rock; Purveyors of the Conscious Sound	Chris Charpentier; Goodrich Gevaart; Zach Peterson; Ian Douglas Terry; Mike Perry; Ryan de la Garza; Cody Wayne Hurd; Louder Than a Bomb Poetry Slam

=== 2014 ===
The sixth annual Maha Music Festival returned to Stinson Park on Saturday, August 16, 2014. The lineup included headliner Death Cab for Cutie, as well as The Head and the Heart, Local Natives, The Both featuring Aimee Mann and Ted Leo, Doomtree, and Radkey. Local groups included Icky Blossoms, The Envy Corps, Twinsmith, Matt Whipkey, M34N STR33T, and Domestica. Schnackel Engineers returned as the main sponsor of the festival.

The Globe tent returned for a second year, featuring comedy presented by OK Party and Louder Than a Bomb slam poetry. New additions to the festival grounds included a ferris wheel, game truck, and a phone charging station.

Attendance topped 7,000 this year, topping the previous year's attendance by nearly 30%, making this the highest attended Maha to date. Around 250 people volunteered to make the 2014 festival a success.

Weitz Stage	Omaha Gives! Stage	The Globe
Death Cab for Cutie; The Head and the Heart; Local Natives; The Both; Doomtree; Twinsmith; Domestica	Icky Blossoms; The Envy Corps; Radkey; M34N STR33T; Matt Whipkey	Josh Androsky; Zach Peterson; Zach Reinert; Ian Douglas Terry; Kyle O'Reilly; Mike Perry; Ryan de la Garza; Cody Wayne Hurd; Louder Than a Bomb Poetry Slam

=== 2015 ===
The seventh Maha Music Festival happened on Saturday, August 15, 2015. The headliners were Modest Mouse and Atmosphere. In the spring, Maha teamed up with other local organizations to hold "Mini Maha" during Loessfest at River's Edge Park in Council Bluffs on May 30. This event featured Ben Kweller, The Dodos, and Lincoln band Oketo. Schnackel Engineers is the main sponsor again this year.

Along with Modest Mouse and Atmosphere, the lineup includes Purity Ring, Wavves, The Jayhawks, Alvvays, The Good Life, Ex Hex, Speedy Ortiz, and local artists Freakabout, All Young Girls Are Machine Guns, and BOTH.

New additions to the festival grounds included a rock climbing wall and a human foosball court in the Community Village. The festival once again grew in terms of tickets sold, selling out for the first time. Attendance was estimated at over 9,000.

Weitz Stage	Javlin Stage	The Globe
Modest Mouse; Purity Ring; Atmosphere; Wavves; The Jayhawks; Ex Hex; BOTH	The Good Life; Speedy Ortiz; All Young Girls Are Machine Guns; Alvvays; FREAKABOUT	Dave Ross; Ian Douglas Terry; Zach Reinert; Mike Perry; Ryan de la Garza; Cody Wayne Hurd; Kyle O'Reilly; Louder Than a Bomb Poetry Slam

=== 2016 ===
The eighth Maha Music Festival happened on Saturday, August 20, 2016. The headliners were Passion Pit and Grimes. Other lineup highlights included the first European act to play Maha, The Joy Formidable, upcoming indie band Car Seat Headrest, and Jay Farrar Trio, who played songs from Son Volt's album Trace. Local acts were headlined by Lincoln native Matthew Sweet along with Josh Hoyer & Soul Colossal, See Through Dresses, and CJ Mills.

Warren Buffett made an appearance to introduce Car Seat Headrest and to promote the Drive 2 Vote initiative.

Weitz Stage	Javlin Stage
Passion Pit; Grimes; Vince Staples; The Joy Formidable; Jay Farrar Trio; Diet Cig; Josh Hoyer & Soul Colossal	Matthew Sweet; Car Seat Headrest; Diarrhea Planet; See Through Dresses; CJ Mills

=== 2017 ===
The ninth Maha Music Festival was held on Saturday, August 19, 2017. The festival was headlined by Run the Jewels, and also included performances by Belle and Sebastian, The Faint, Sleigh Bells, The New Pornographers, Built to Spill, Torres, Priests, High Up, and the Hottman Sisters. Rain and lightning cut Run the Jewels' set short at the end of the night. The festival hosted an estimated 8,500 attendees.

Weitz Stage	OMNE Stage
Run the Jewels; The Faint; Belle and Sebastian; The New Pornographers; Torres; Downtown Boys	Sleigh Bells; Built to Spill; Priests; High Up; Hottman Sisters

=== 2018 ===
Maha Music Festival celebrated its tenth anniversary in 2018, expanding to two days and holding the event on Friday, August 17 and Saturday, August 18, 2018. It also partnered with Big Omaha, a conference that celebrates entrepreneurship and innovation, which also celebrated its tenth year. The presenting sponsor for the festival was Buildertrend. At the top of this year's bill were Saturday night headliner Weezer, arguably the festival's biggest act to date; Father John Misty; and Friday night headliner TV On the Radio. The reported attendance for Friday night was 6,500.

Friday, August 17, 2018

Decade Stage	OMNE Stage	Comedy and Slam Poetry Tent
TV On the Radio; ZZ Ward; Hurray for the Riff Raff; Clarence Tilton	Benjamin Booker; State Disco	OK Party Comedy

Saturday, August 18, 2018

Decade Stage	OMNE Stage	Comedy and Slam Poetry Tent
Weezer; Father John Misty; Tune-Yards; Hop Along; U.S. Girls; The Dilla Kids	The Kills; Ravyn Lenae; Mesonjixx; David Nance Band	OK Party Comedy; Louder Than a Bomb Poetry Slam; OK Party Comedy; Louder Than a Bomb Poetry Slam

=== 2019 ===
The eleventh Maha Music Festival, now shortened to Maha Festival, took place Wednesday, August 14, 2019, through Saturday, August 17, 2019. The first day included a kickoff event at multiple local venues in the city's Little Bohemia neighborhood. The second day included an innovation conference, Maha Discovery, followed by an indie rock concert dubbed the Maha Middle Show, which was headlined by Pinback and took place at The Waiting Room Lounge in the Benson neighborhood. The traditional full music days once again took place at Stinson Park in Aksarben Village. The total reported attendance was 14,500.

Thursday, August 15, 2019

The Waiting Room Lounge
- Pinback
- Bach Mai
- Nick Reinhart

Friday, August 16, 2019

Main Stage	Broadmoor Stage
Jenny Lewis; Courtney Barnett; Esencia Latina Band	Snail Mail; SharkWeek

Saturday, August 17, 2019

Main Stage	Broadmoor Stage
Lizzo; Matt and Kim; Duckwrth; Beach Bunny; Domestic Blend	Oh Sees; Matt Maeson; Omaha Girls Rock; Muscle Cousins; SharkWeek

=== 2020 ===
The 2020 festival was cancelled due to the worldwide COVID-19 pandemic.

=== 2021 ===
Maha Festival returned to Stinson Park in 2021. The event was scaled down compared to previous years, reducing back to a single day, and took place on Saturday, July 31. This marked the first time the festival occurred outside the month of August.

WP Engine Stage	Broadmoor Stage
Khruangbin; Thundercat; Drive-By Truckers; Matt Cox & the Marauders; Dirt House; Kethro; crabrangucci	Japanese Breakfast; Shovels & Rope; Edem Soul Music; J. Crum

=== 2022 ===
The 2022 edition of the Maha Festival took place Friday, July 29 and Saturday, July 30. An estimated 11,500 people attended, including 1,100 children under 10 years old.

Friday, July 29, 2022

Union Pacific Stage	Side Stage
Car Seat Headrest; Sweeping Promises; Las Cruxes	Indigo De Souza; Bad Self Portraits; Bartees Strange (was announced with the original lineup, but was not able to perform.)

Saturday, July 30, 2022

Union Pacific Stage	Side Stage
Beach House; Princess Nokia; Rolling Blackouts Coastal Fever; Geese; Omaha Girls Rock; The Real Zebos; DJ Shor-T	PUP; Sudan Archives; Marcey Yates; Dominique Morgan

=== 2023 ===
The 2023 edition of the Maha Festival is scheduled to take place Friday, July 28 and Saturday, July 29.

Friday, July 28, 2023

Union Pacific Stage	LinkedIn Stage
Turnstile; Alvvays; Icky Blossoms; BIB	EKKSTACY; HAKIM; YALLA

Saturday, July 29, 2023

Union Pacific Stage	LinkedIn Stage
Big Thief; Peach Pit; Terry Presume; Say She She; Omaha Girls Rock; Garst; YALLA	The Beths; Black Belt Eagle Scout; M34N STR33T; Nebraska Writers Collective Youth Poets; Ebba Rose

=== 2024 ===
Maha took 2024 off to "rework the festival's operating model with plans to return in 2025." Organizers cited "a need to rework Maha's operating model combined with industry-wide increases in costs for talent, transportation, labor, security, and insurance," and also indicated the possibility of exploring national partnerships for future years. They also noted overall production costs for festivals around the world having increased by up to 50%, which has caused many festivals to close.

The festival was set to be relocated to the newly renovated Heartland of America Park in downtown Omaha, which would have marked the festival's return to The RiverFront for the first time since 2010, after which Maha left the Lewis and Clark Landing.

In December 2024, Maha announced plans to return in 2025.

=== 2025 ===
The 16th edition of the Maha Festival is scheduled to take place on Saturday, August 2, 2025, at the newly renovated Heartland of America Park. This will mark the festival's return to downtown Omaha's RiverFront for the first time since the 2010 festival; the festival had relocated from the RiverFront due to the Missouri River flooding in summer 2011. Maha is welcoming back its original founders, Mike App, Tre Brashear, Tyler Owen, and Mike Toohey. The founding foursome had started the newer Outlandia Music Festival in Bellevue back in 2022, but cited they would end Outlandia going forward to focus on Maha. 1% Productions is contracted to produce the event.

The festival was headlined by indie rock legends Pixies, and also included the return of local band Little Brazil, who played the very first Maha Festival.

Saturday, August 2, 2025

MAHA Stage
- Pixies
- Waxahatchee
- Band of Horses
- Magdalena Bay
- Silversun Pickups
- Little Brazil
