= La Ferrière, Côtes-d'Armor =

La Ferrière Kerhouarn
- Part of Plémet
- Location of La Ferrière
- Location within France Location within Brittany
- Coordinates: 48°08′34″N 2°36′19″W
- Country: France
- Region: Brittany
- Department: Côtes-d'Armor
- Arrondissement: Saint-Brieuc
- Canton: Loudéac
- Commune: Plémet
- Area^{1}: 15.64 km^{2} (6.04 sq mi)
- Highest elevation: 188 m (617 ft)
- Lowest elevation: 70 m (230 ft)
- Population (2023): 439
  - Density: 28.1/km^{2} (72.7/sq mi)
- Time zone: UTC+01:00 (CET)
  - Summer (DST): UTC+02:00 (CEST)
- Postal code: 22210
- ^{1} French Land Register data, which excludes lakes, ponds, glaciers > 1 km^{2} (0.386 sq mi or 247 acres) and river estuaries.

La Ferrière (French pronunciation: [la fɛʁjɛʁ]; Breton: Kerhouarn; Gallo: La Ferierr) is a former commune in the Côtes-d'Armor department of Brittany in north-western France. On 1 January 2016, it was merged into the new commune Les Moulins, which was renamed Plémet in December 2017. Inhabitants of La Ferrière are called in French ferrandiers.

== See also ==
- Communes of the Côtes-d'Armor department
- List of works of the two Folgoët ateliers
