= Saint-Barnabé (disambiguation) =

Saint-Barnabé may refer to the following places:

- Saint-Barnabé, a commune in France
- Saint-Barnabé, Quebec, a parish municipality in Quebec
- Saint-Barnabé-Sud, Quebec, a municipality in Quebec that was formerly a parish municipality named Saint-Barnabé (until 1992)
