= La Chèze =

La Chèze Kez
- Commune
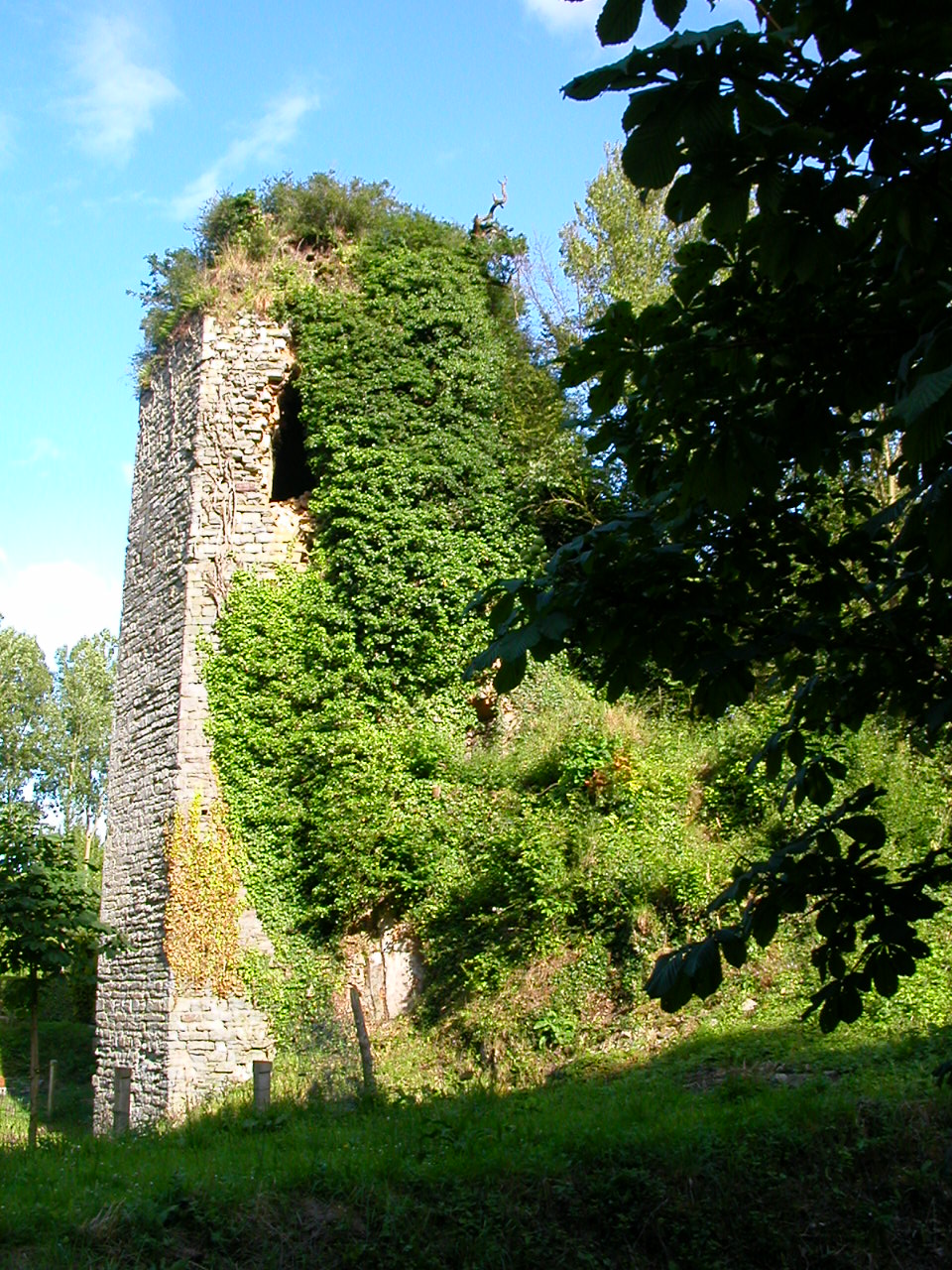
- Ruins of the chateau

- Coat of arms
- Location of La Chèze
- Location within France Location within Brittany
- Coordinates: 48°07′56″N 2°39′18″W
- Country: France
- Region: Brittany
- Department: Côtes-d'Armor
- Arrondissement: Saint-Brieuc
- Canton: Loudéac
- Intercommunality: Loudéac Communauté - Bretagne Centre

Government
  - Mayor (2020–2026): Marie-Gwénola Hollebecq
- Area^{1}: 2.53 km^{2} (0.98 sq mi)
- Highest elevation: 141 m (463 ft)
- Lowest elevation: 67 m (220 ft)
- Population (2023): 578
  - Density: 228/km^{2} (592/sq mi)
- Time zone: UTC+01:00 (CET)
  - Summer (DST): UTC+02:00 (CEST)
- INSEE/Postal code: 22039 /22210
- ^{1} French Land Register data, which excludes lakes, ponds, glaciers > 1 km^{2} (0.386 sq mi or 247 acres) and river estuaries.

La Chèze (French pronunciation: [la ʃɛz]; Breton: Kez) is a commune in the Côtes-d'Armor department of Brittany in northwestern France.

== Administration ==
La Chèze is divided into different quarters:

- Le Bougard
- Belle-vue
- Des Colombières
- La Grange

=== Mayors ===
The current mayor of La Chèze is Catherine Journel. She's of miscellaneous left and a veterinary, she replaced retiring Socialist incumbent Jean-Yves Bothere, in office from 1995 to 2014

- Marie Thérèse Angoujard mayor from 1992 to 1995;
- Théodore Angoujard mayor Socialist from 1977 to 1992;
- André Fairier mayor from 1947 to 1977.

== Demography ==
Historical population
Year	Pop.	±% p.a.
1968	587	—
1975	606	+0.46%
1982	571	−0.85%
1990	597	+0.56%
1999	569	−0.53%
2007	613	+0.94%
2012	570	−1.44%
2017	563	−0.25%
2023	578	+0.44%
Source: INSEE

Inhabitants of La Chèze are called Chéziens in French.

== Culture ==
=== Festival ===
The festival Blues au château ("Blues at the castle" in English) created in 2006 to support the association for the protection of the castle. Several concerts are organised every year.

==== Programme ====
- Edition 2018ː This 12th edition took place from 16 to 19 August, on the farm's scene and the mansion's scene, particularly.
  - Thursdayː Ladyva, An Diaz and Raphaël Wressnig and the Soul Gift Band.
  - Friday: Dave Kelly, Sarah James, Ladyva, Jose Luis Pardo (solo) and Raphaël Wressnig and the Soul Gift Band.
  - Saturdayː An Diaz, Brooks Williams, Dave Kelly, Jose Lui Pardo (band) and Josh Hoyer & Soul Colossal.
  - Sunday: Jose Luis Pardo (solo), Sarah James, Brooks Williams and Josh Hoyer and Soul Colossal.
- Edition 2017: This 11th edition took place from 17 to 20 August, on the Barn's scene and the castle's scene, particularly.
  - Thursday: One Rusty Band and B. B. & The Blues Shacks;
  - Friday: The Blue Butter Pot, Derrin Neuendorf, Owen Campbell and B.B & the Blues Shacks;
  - Saturday: Mark Keen, Ghalia Vauthier, One Rusty Band, Lisa Mills and Alligator Nail
  - Sunday: Lisa Mills, Owen Campbell, Derrin Neuendorf and Little Steve & the Big Beat
- Edition 2016: This 10th edition took place from 20 to 23 August, to the mansion, at the pound and on the castle's scene, particularly.
  - Thursday: Pugsley Buzzard, Paola Ronci and the Hay Bale Stompers.
  - Friday: Slidin Slim, Paola Ronci, the Hay Bale Stompers, Julian Burdock trio, Thorbjørn Risager and The Black Tornado.
  - Saturday: Julian Burdock, Pugsley Buzzard, Slidin Slim, Daniel Eriksen and Ian Parker Band.
  - Sunday: Ian Parker, Paolo Ronci, the Hay Bale Stumpers, Sydney Ellis and Her Midnight Preachers.

== See also ==
- Communes of the Côtes-d'Armor department
