= Coëtlogon, Côtes-d'Armor =

Coëtlogon Koedlogon
- Part of Plumieux
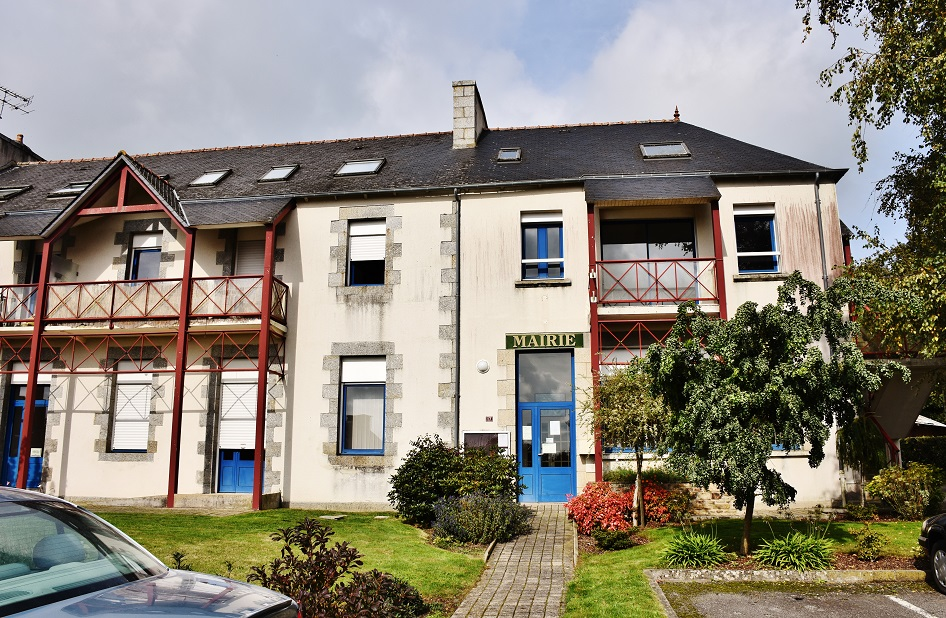
- Town hall

- Coat of arms
- Location of Coëtlogon
- Location within France Location within Brittany
- Coordinates: 48°08′33″N 2°32′34″W
- Country: France
- Region: Brittany
- Department: Côtes-d'Armor
- Arrondissement: Saint-Brieuc
- Canton: Loudéac
- Intercommunality: Loudéac Communauté - Bretagne Centre
- Commune: Plumieux
- Area^{1}: 16.35 km^{2} (6.31 sq mi)
- Highest elevation: 182 m (597 ft)
- Lowest elevation: 77 m (253 ft)
- Population (2023): 233
  - Density: 14.3/km^{2} (36.9/sq mi)
- Time zone: UTC+01:00 (CET)
  - Summer (DST): UTC+02:00 (CEST)
- Postal code: 22210
- ^{1} French Land Register data, which excludes lakes, ponds, glaciers > 1 km^{2} (0.386 sq mi or 247 acres) and river estuaries.

Coëtlogon (French pronunciation: [kwɛtlɔɡɔ̃]; Breton: Koedlogon; Gallo: Cotlagon) is a former commune in the Côtes-d'Armor department of Brittany in northwestern France. On 1 January 2025, it was merged into the commune of Plumieux.

== Toponymy ==
The name Coëtlogon is typically Breton, "koad" meaning "wood" with the lieu-dit "Logon". Inhabitants of Coëtlogon are called Logonais or Coëtlogonnais in French.

== See also ==
- Communes of the Côtes-d'Armor department
