= Red Sky Music Festival =

Music festival in Omaha, Nebraska, USA

- Dates: July 18–23 (2011), July 18, 20-21 (2012)
- Locations: TD Ameritrade Park, Omaha, Nebraska, U.S.
- Founders: Live Nation, Metropolitan Entertainment and Convention Authority
- Website: redskyfestival.com

Red Sky Music Festival was a yearly music festival held at TD Ameritrade Park in Omaha, Nebraska, in 2011 and 2012. The format for the festival included a headlining act closing each night with local and national acts performing on stages around the stadium during the day. The festival aimed to include many different genres of music. In its short history, Red Sky attracted headlining acts from classic rockers Journey and Def Leppard to country artists Jason Aldean and Brad Paisley to local favorite 311. The festival also served as a showcase for many local artists. MECA's inspiration for the format of the festival was Milwaukee's Summerfest.

On October 20, 2012, MECA announced that there would not be another Red Sky Music Festival. They cited difficulties including scheduling artists around summer tours and the blistering July heat. They said there would still be concerts at TD Ameritrade Park, just not in festival format, which would allow them more flexibility.

== 2011 ==
Omaha's Metropolitan Entertainment and Convention Authority (MECA) hoped to feature at least 50 bands on three stages for the festival's inaugural year. The plan was to have local acts perform in the early afternoon, national acts perform in the late afternoon to early evening, and then a headliner close out each night inside TD Ameritrade Park. In all the festival hosted 37 local acts alongside 35 national acts, although the final day of the festival featured local acts only. Notable national performers (on the B and C stages located in the parking lot south of the stadium) included Sister Hazel, John Ondrasik of Five for Fighting, George Clinton & Parliament-Funkadelic, Tonic, The Charlie Daniels Band, STS9, Bruce Hornsby and the Noisemakers, as well as guitar greats Eric Johnson and Buddy Guy. The lineup was as follows:

(Artists listed from earliest to latest set times)

Monday, July 18, 2011:

- Main Stage: Night Ranger, Journey
- B Stage: Mojo Bag, Avaricious, Lemon Fresh Day, The Fab Four, Five for Fighting
- C Stage: Rhythm Collective, Witness Tree, Chris Saub, Sister Hazel, Better Than Ezra

Tuesday, July 19, 2011:

- Main Stage: Sublime with Rome, 311
- B Stage: Vago, The Bishops, Big Gigantic, STS9
- C Stage: Straight Outta Jr. High, Satchel Grande, Kids These Days, Cornmeal, George Clinton

Wednesday, July 20, 2011:

- Main Stage: Leroy Powell, Jamey Johnson, Kid Rock
- B Stage: Bad Country, Steve Villamonte, Marcos & Sabor, Chad Lee, The Charlie Daniels Band
- C Stage: Paisty Jenny, Answer Team, Rock Paper Dynamite, Tonic, Soul Asylum

Thursday, July 21, 2011:

- Main Stage: Sonia Leigh, Blackberry Smoke, Zac Brown Band
- B Stage: Mitch Gettman, Session 7, Michael Williams, Eric Johnson, Buddy Guy with Quinn Sullivan
- C Stage: Velvet Crush, The Confidentials, Finest Hour, 10,000 Maniacs, Bruce Hornsby and the Noisemakers

Friday, July 22, 2011:

- Main Stage: Chris Young, Thompson Square, Jason Aldean
- B Stage: Crossfire, The Willards, Shiela Greenland, Ingram Hill, Cowboy Mouth
- C Stage: Blue Bird, Cowboy Up, Jaymie Jones, The Dirt Drifters, Randy Rogers Band

Saturday, July 23, 2011:

- B Stage: Take Me to Vegas, We Be Lions, Hookshot, VooDoo Method, Linoma Mashers
- C Stage: Cleo’s Apartment, Moon Juice, Midwest Dilemma, Matt Cox Band, Kris Lager Band

MECA estimated that around 80,000 people were in attendance.

== 2012 ==
The first news of the 2012 version of the festival was that it would be shorted from six to four days, July 18-21. The festival was again shortened to three days when a headlining act was unable to be found for the Thursday, July 19 date. Only the B Stage is returning in 2012, although scheduled acts are significantly lesser known than the previous year. Admission to the B stage is free, sponsored by TD Ameritrade. The scheduled lineup includes:

(Artists listed from earliest to latest set times)

Wednesday, July 18, 2012:

- Main Stage: Edens Edge, Little Big Town, Eli Young Band, Rascal Flatts
- B Stage: Logan Mize, The Farm

Friday, July 20, 2012:

- Main Stage: The Lost Trailers, The Band Perry, Brad Paisley
- B Stage: Belles & Whistles, Crossfire, Charlie Worsham, Kristen Kelly

Saturday, July 21, 2012:

- Main Stage: Lita Ford, Poison, Def Leppard
- B Stage: Chad Lee, Marcos & Sabor, Toy Box, Moonjuice, Rock Paper Dynamite

== See also ==
- Music of Omaha
- Downtown Omaha
- Maha Music Festival
