= Kris Lager Band =

- Origin: Omaha, Nebraska, United States
- Genres: Blues rock
- Years active: 2006–present
- Website: Official website

Kris Lager Band is an American blues rock group. Lager and his band have self-released 13 albums between 2006 and 2022.

== Career ==
Kris Lager was born in Lincoln, Nebraska, United States, but formed his band in 2006 in Omaha, Nebraska. They are a hard working outfit and initially performed around Nebraska. In 2007, they were invited by frontman and vocalist Mato Nanji to become the latest version of his band Indigenous. They backed him for over two years in consistent touring and performed on Indigenous' Vanguard Records release, Broken Lands (2008). When that venture reached its conclusion, the Kris Lager band continued as before self-releasing albums along the way. Lager acts as the frontman, vocalist, guitarist and songwriter. In July 2011, the Kris Lager Band performed at the Red Sky Music Festival. The band are known to perform around 200 shows every year.

In 2014, Heavy Soul & Boogie Trance was an all-analog and mostly live recording, and was produced by Kelly Finnigan and Ian McDonald of Monophonics. The CD was recorded at Transistor Studios and mixed by Sergio Rios of Orgone. Tab Benoit produced KLB's release Platte River Runaway, at his home studio in Houma, Louisiana. Lager also worked and toured alongside Andy Frasco & The U.N. The group recorded three of Lager's songs on their 2014 album, Half A Man, and another Lager composition was included in the track list on their Ruf Records live album, Songs From The Road (2017). In early 2018, KLB issued another album, Love Songs & Life Lines. It was recorded at White Wall Studios in Sioux Falls, South Dakota, and was mixed by Jim Gaines. On reviewer noted that the collection was "a slight departure from their 'swaggering rock 'n' roll' and blues infused electric guitar grooves that make up a lot of their 2016 release Rise and Shine".

The line-up of the band has fluctuated over the years, but mainly consisted of Lager (vocals, guitar), Jeremiah Weir (keyboards and percussion), John Fairchild (percussion) and Brandon Miller (bass guitar). In 2021, Lager self-released his CD, Blues Lover. The 2022 album, Presence, marked a departure from the norm, with Lager writing and recording the entire album on his TASCAM 388 Studio tape machine. The collection featured ten original songs by Lager plus his version of King Floyd's "I Really Love You". The watershed saw long time drummer John Fairchild depart after almost 17 years in situ, and bassist Joe Donnelly switch from purely touring duties to become a full time band member in place of Miller. In September 2022 a single was released under Lager's name only entitled "Breathe In The Sunshine".

The Kris Lager Band are scheduled to support NRBQ on the latter's November 2022 tour.

== Discography ==
=== Albums ===
Year	Title	Label
2006	Roots Revival	Self-released
2007	Kris Lager Band	Self-released
2007	Transient	Self-released
2009	The Mighty Quinn	Self-released
2012	Swagadocious	Self-released
2013	Live at the Bourbon Theatre	Self-released
2014	Heavy Soul & Boogie Trance	Self-released
2016	Rise and Shine	Self-released
2016	Platte River Runaway	Self-released
2018	Love Songs & Life Lines	Self-released
2019	Spectrum	Self-released
2021	Blues Lover	Self-released
2022	Presence	Self-released

NB. The releases are variously listed as either by Kris Lager Band or Kris Lager.
