= Plumieux =

Plumieux Pluvaeg
- Commune
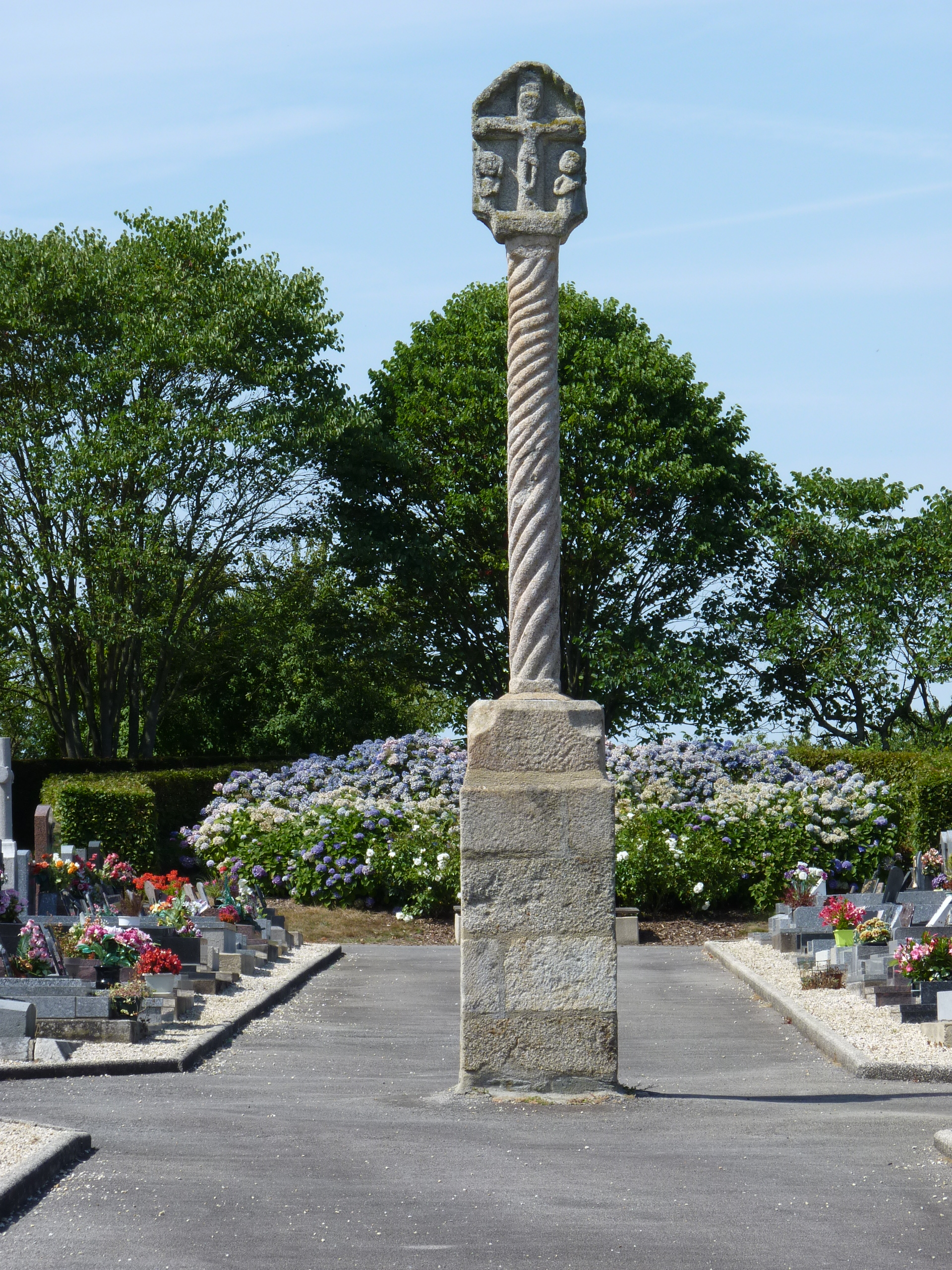
- The 16th century cemetery cross
- Location of Plumieux
- Location within France Location within Brittany
- Coordinates: 48°06′14″N 2°34′59″W
- Country: France
- Region: Brittany
- Department: Côtes-d'Armor
- Arrondissement: Saint-Brieuc
- Canton: Loudéac
- Intercommunality: Loudéac Communauté − Bretagne Centre

Government
  - Mayor (2020–2026): Sébastien Quinio
- Area^{1}: 73.29 km^{2} (28.30 sq mi)
- Highest elevation: 182 m (597 ft)
- Lowest elevation: 50 m (160 ft)
- Population (2023): 1,678
  - Density: 22.90/km^{2} (59.30/sq mi)
- Demonym(s): Plumetais, Plumentaise
- Time zone: UTC+01:00 (CET)
  - Summer (DST): UTC+02:00 (CEST)
- INSEE/Postal code: 22241 /22210
- ^{1} French Land Register data, which excludes lakes, ponds, glaciers > 1 km^{2} (0.386 sq mi or 247 acres) and river estuaries.

Plumieux (French pronunciation: [plymjø]; Breton: Pluvaeg; Gallo: Ploemioec) is a commune in the Côtes-d'Armor department of Brittany in northwestern France. On 1 January 2025, the former commune of Le Cambout and Coëtlogon were merged into Plumieux.

Inhabitants of Plumieux are called plumetais and plumetaise in French.

== Politics and administration ==
As of 2020 municipal election, the Conseil Municipal de Plumieux is composed of 15 elected members, including the mayor. The communes representation on the conseil communautaire of Loudéac Communauté - Bretagne Centre also consists of one elected member.

List of Mayors of Plumieux
In office		Mayor	Party	Ref.
before 1981	?	Joseph Guéguen		
March 1989	June 1995	Francis Anger		
June 1995	March 2008	Rolande Pichard		
March 2008	March 2014	Gérard Connan		
March 2014	28 May 2020	Pierrick Le Cam	Ind.	
28 May 2020	Incumbent	Sébastien Quinio		

== Local culture and heritage ==
=== Significant places and monuments ===
- Saint-Pierre Church (French: Église Saint-Pierre).
- 16th century cemetery cross (French: Croix du cimetière).
- Historic St. Leau chapelle (French: Ancienne chapelle de St. Leau), since torn down.

== See also ==
- Communes of the Côtes-d'Armor department
