= Le Cambout =

Le Cambout Ar C'hembod
- Part of Plumieux
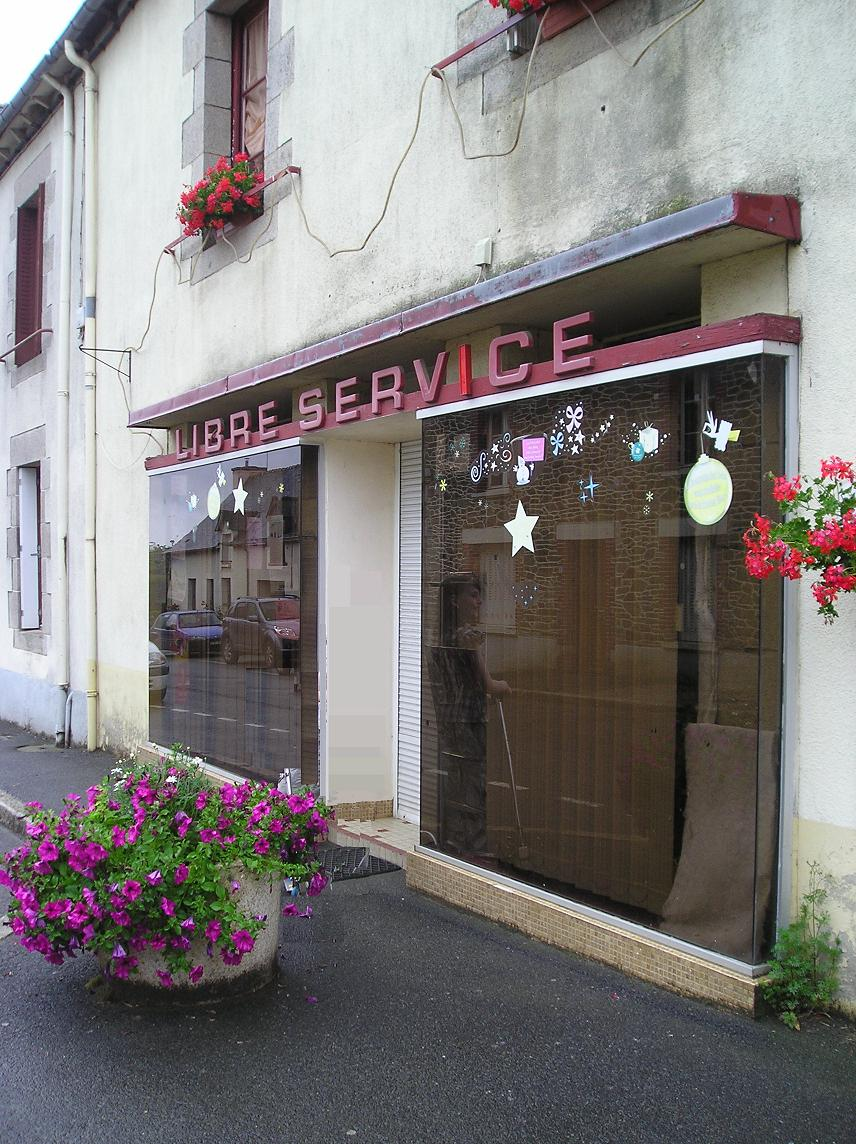
- Self-service shop in Le Cambout

- Coat of arms
- Location of Le Cambout
- Location within France Location within Brittany
- Coordinates: 48°03′34″N 2°36′33″W
- Country: France
- Region: Brittany
- Department: Côtes-d'Armor
- Arrondissement: Saint-Brieuc
- Canton: Loudéac
- Intercommunality: Loudéac Communauté - Bretagne Centre
- Commune: Plumieux
- Area^{1}: 18.02 km^{2} (6.96 sq mi)
- Highest elevation: 137 m (449 ft)
- Lowest elevation: 50 m (160 ft)
- Population (2023): 416
  - Density: 23.1/km^{2} (59.8/sq mi)
- Time zone: UTC+01:00 (CET)
  - Summer (DST): UTC+02:00 (CEST)
- Postal code: 22210
- ^{1} French Land Register data, which excludes lakes, ponds, glaciers > 1 km^{2} (0.386 sq mi or 247 acres) and river estuaries.

Le Cambout (French pronunciation: [lə kɑ̃bu]; Breton: Ar C'hembod; Gallo: Le Canbót) is a former commune in the Côtes-d'Armor department of Brittany in northwestern France, within easy reach of the towns of Josselin, Loudeac, and Pontivy. On 1 January 2025, it was merged into the commune of Plumieux. Inhabitants of Le Cambout are called Cambutiades in French.

The commune is divided into many smaller settlements, among them Bourg, Bas Bourg, and Tréhorel.

== Amenities ==
The village of Le Cambout is served by a boulangerie and a tabac.

There is a church in the centre of the village and a separate, well-kept graveyard a little way off. There is a sports field to the west of the village and an area known as L'Étang de gué aux loupes which has facilities such as a lake, children's playground, camping facilities and Boules lanes. There are a number of British-owned gites in the village aimed at attracting foreign tourists to the area.

== See also ==
- Communes of the Côtes-d'Armor department
