= Mt. Fuji Records =

Mt Fuji Records
- Founded: 2001; 25 years ago
- Defunct: 2012
- Genre: Indie
- Country of origin: USA
- Location: Seattle

Mt. Fuji Records was an independent record label based in Seattle, Washington. Their roster included rock bands such as Little Brazil, The Cops and Slender Means. As of 26 November 2012, they are defunct.

== Bands ==
- The Cops
- Little Brazil
- Slender Means
- New Candidates

== See also ==
- List of record labels
