= Slender Means =

American indie rock band

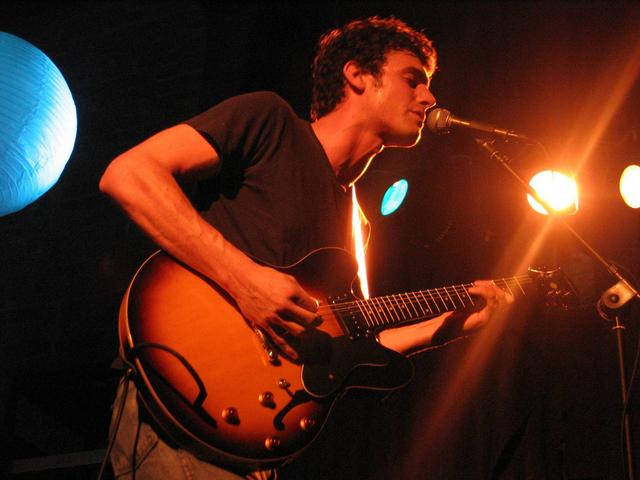
- Slender Means performing in St. George, Utah at The Electric Theater. Pictured: Josh Dawson

Background information
- Origin: Seattle, Washington
- Genres: Indie rock
- Years active: 2003 – 2010
- Members: Josh Dawson; Sonny Votolato; Paul Pugliese; David E. Martin; Eric Wennberg
- Website: www.slendermeans.com

Slender Means (2003–2010) was an indie rock band from Seattle, Washington. Their debut album, Neon & Ruin on Mt. Fuji Records, was released Tuesday, August 23, 2005, on Mt. Fuji Records. In 2007 they put out a five-song E.P. containing previously unreleased material and a live track from the 90.3 KEXP show, Audio Oasis. On November 15, 2009, they released their 2nd LP "Adrift In The Cosmos." The writing of their 3rd LP came to an abrupt halt at the end of 2010 when the band decided to take an extended hiatus until finally announcing they had officially broken up. Some of the other members are still busy playing in other projects. Eric Wennberg had a project called Mal de Mer, and more recently joined up with The Young Evils. Eric and Josh and Paul have also been recording some material in a new project called, Timbre Barons. Paul Pugliese is playing in the surfy, gypsy jazz trio "Johnny NordstrUm and the Retailers." Dave E. Martin joined up with the Pop/Rock band Black Whales in September 2010. He was asked to fill in on keyboards for a show after Mike Bayer decided to leave the band to focus on his other music projects. Black Whales released their debut full-length record "Shangri-La Indeed!"on June 28, 2011. Martin contributed keyboards to 6 tracks and a musical saw track that was looped at the beginning of the album's opening song. Sonny Votolato recently played bass on his brother Rocky's "Television Of Saints" record. In March 2012, Sonny, Paul and Dave reunited to form the new band "Bye Gones" with Drummer Abdon Valdez. Their first show was played at Sweet Lou's in North Seattle on August 18, 2012. Bye Gones was a very short lived project and came to an end around October 2012. However, Martin has continued to write songs for yet another project under the moniker, Ghost Pains along with Absolute Monarchs drummer Michael Stubz.

== Discography ==
- Neon & Ruin (2005)
- Rock 'n' Roll Machine EP (2007)
- Adrift in the Cosmos (15 November 2009)

== Members ==
- Josh Dawson - Lead vocals, guitar
- Sonny Votolato - guitar/backing vocals
- Paul Pugliese - bass
- David E. Martin - keyboards/backing vocals
- Eric Wennberg - drums
