= Plémet =

Plémet Plezeved
- Commune
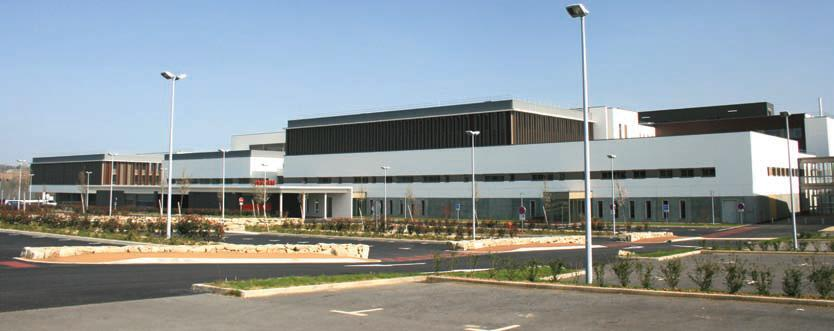
- Medical Center of Central Brittany

- Coat of arms
- Location of Plémet
- Location within France Location within Brittany
- Coordinates: 48°10′40″N 2°35′37″W
- Country: France
- Region: Brittany
- Department: Côtes-d'Armor
- Arrondissement: Saint-Brieuc
- Canton: Loudéac
- Intercommunality: Loudéac Communauté - Bretagne Centre
- Area^{1}: 56.64 km^{2} (21.87 sq mi)
- Highest elevation: 241 m (791 ft)
- Lowest elevation: 70 m (230 ft)
- Population (2023): 3,764
  - Density: 66.45/km^{2} (172.1/sq mi)
- Time zone: UTC+01:00 (CET)
  - Summer (DST): UTC+02:00 (CEST)
- INSEE/Postal code: 22183 /22210
- ^{1} French Land Register data, which excludes lakes, ponds, glaciers > 1 km^{2} (0.386 sq mi or 247 acres) and river estuaries.

Plémet (French pronunciation: [plemɛ]; Breton: Plezeved; Gallo: Plémaèu) is a commune in the Côtes-d'Armor department of Brittany in northwestern France. On 1 January 2016, it was merged with La Ferrière into the new commune Les Moulins, which was renamed Plémet in December 2017.

== Population ==
Historical population
Year	Pop.	±% p.a.
1968	3,461	—
1975	3,537	+0.31%
1982	3,554	+0.07%
1990	3,541	−0.05%
1999	3,384	−0.50%
2007	3,377	−0.03%
2012	3,590	+1.23%
2017	3,649	+0.33%
2023	3,764	+0.52%
Source: INSEE

== Gallery ==
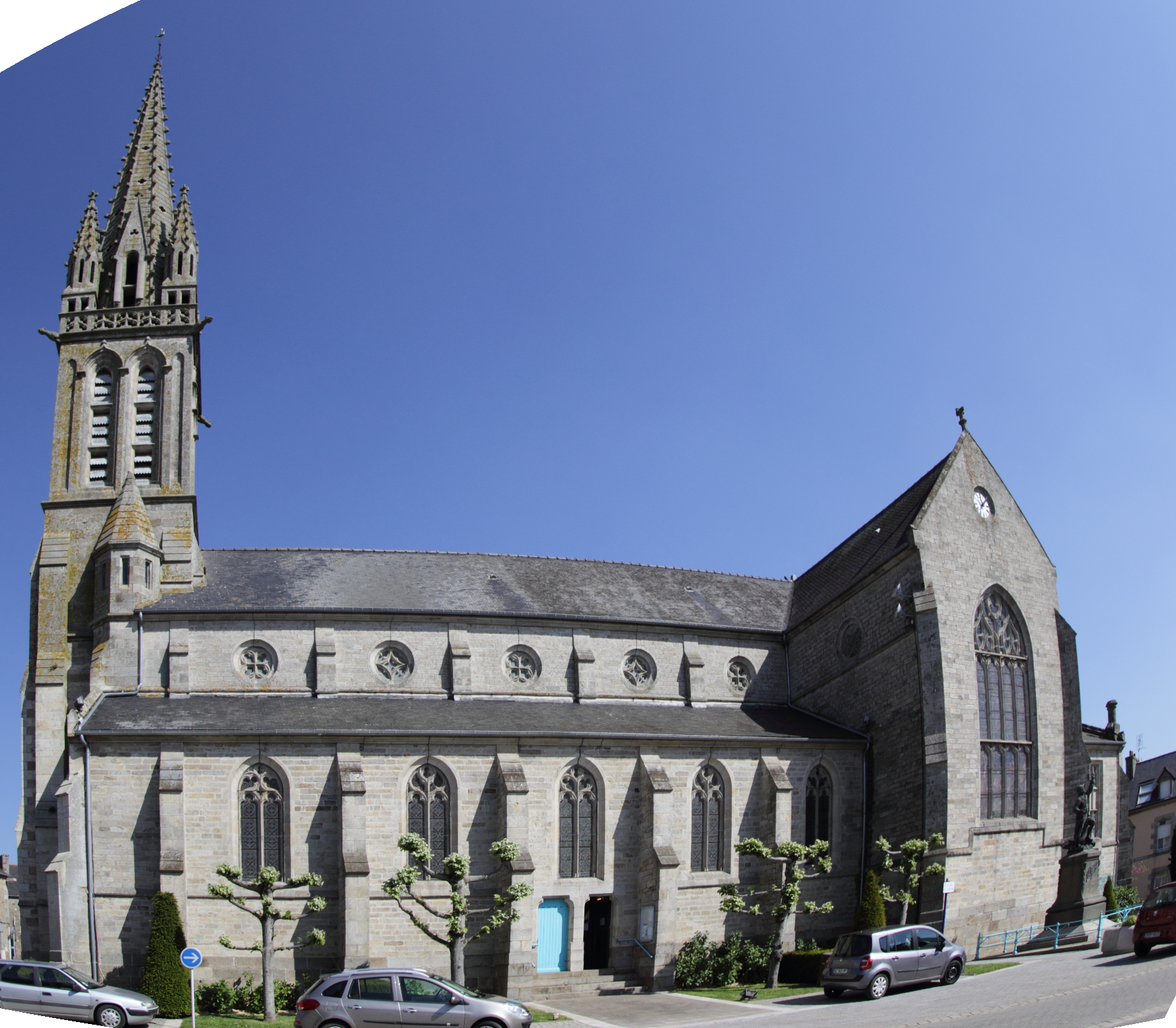

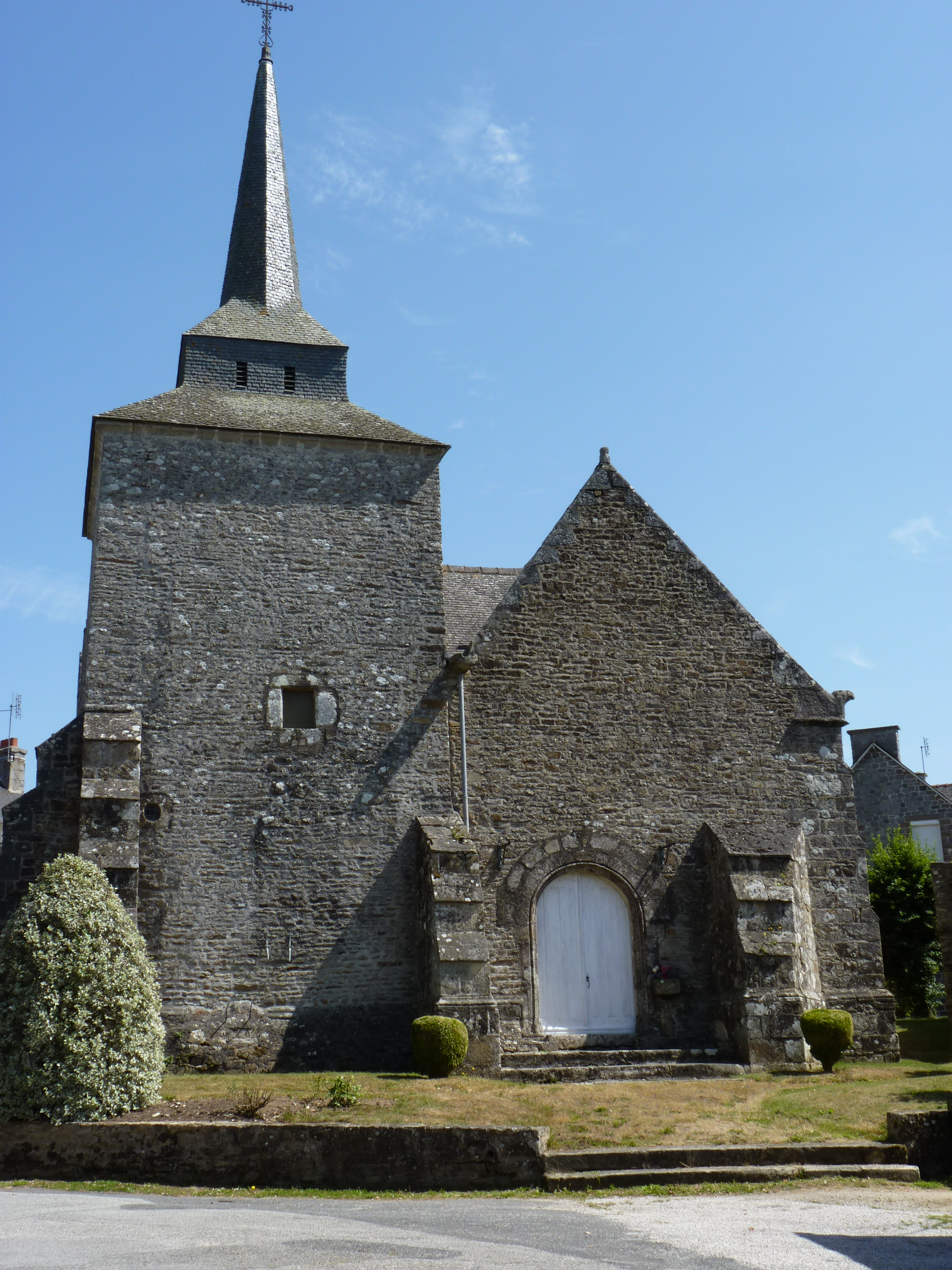

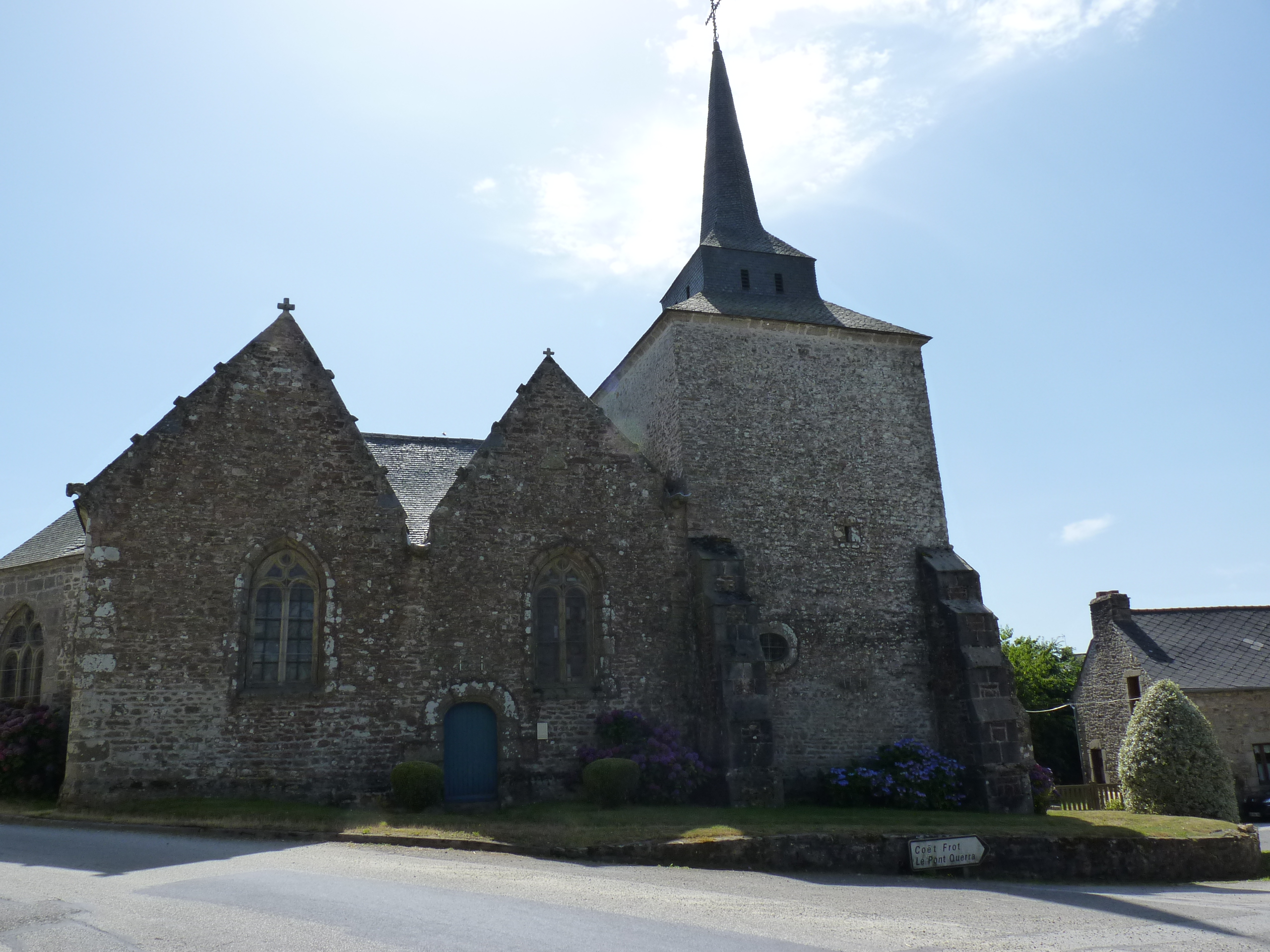

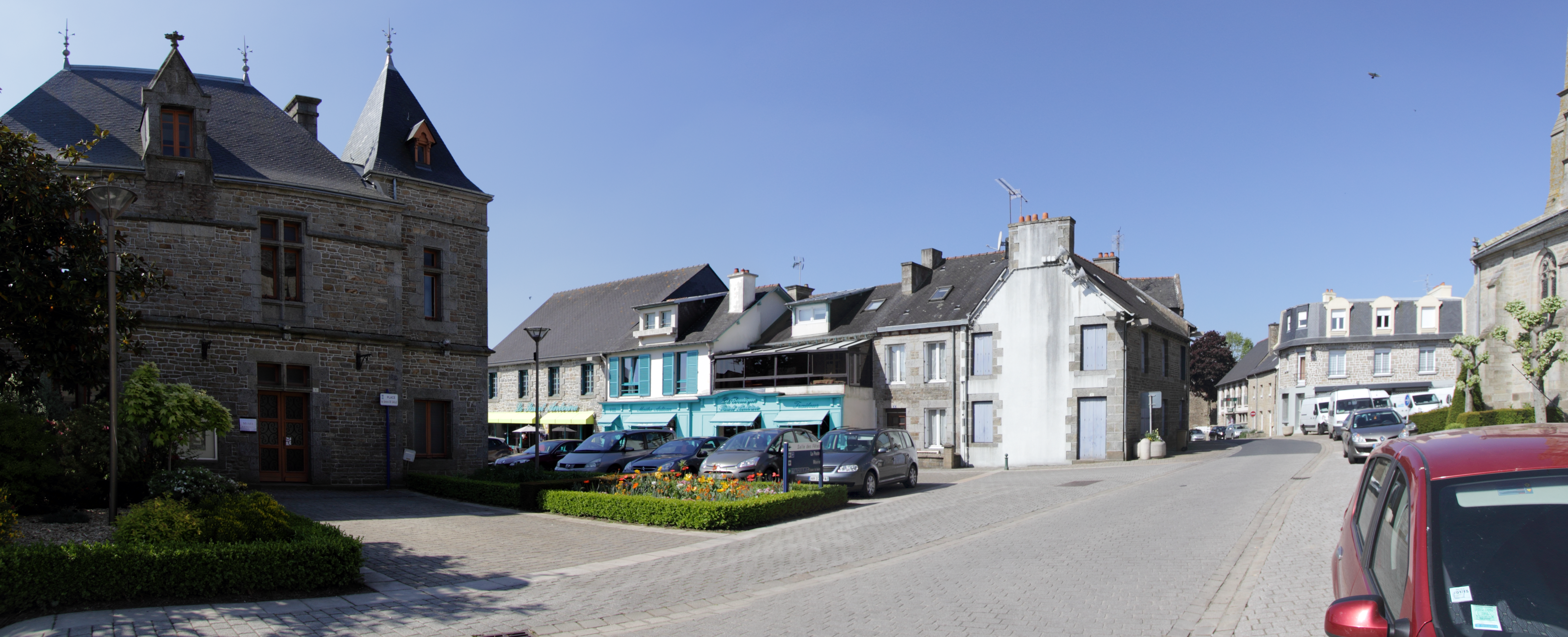

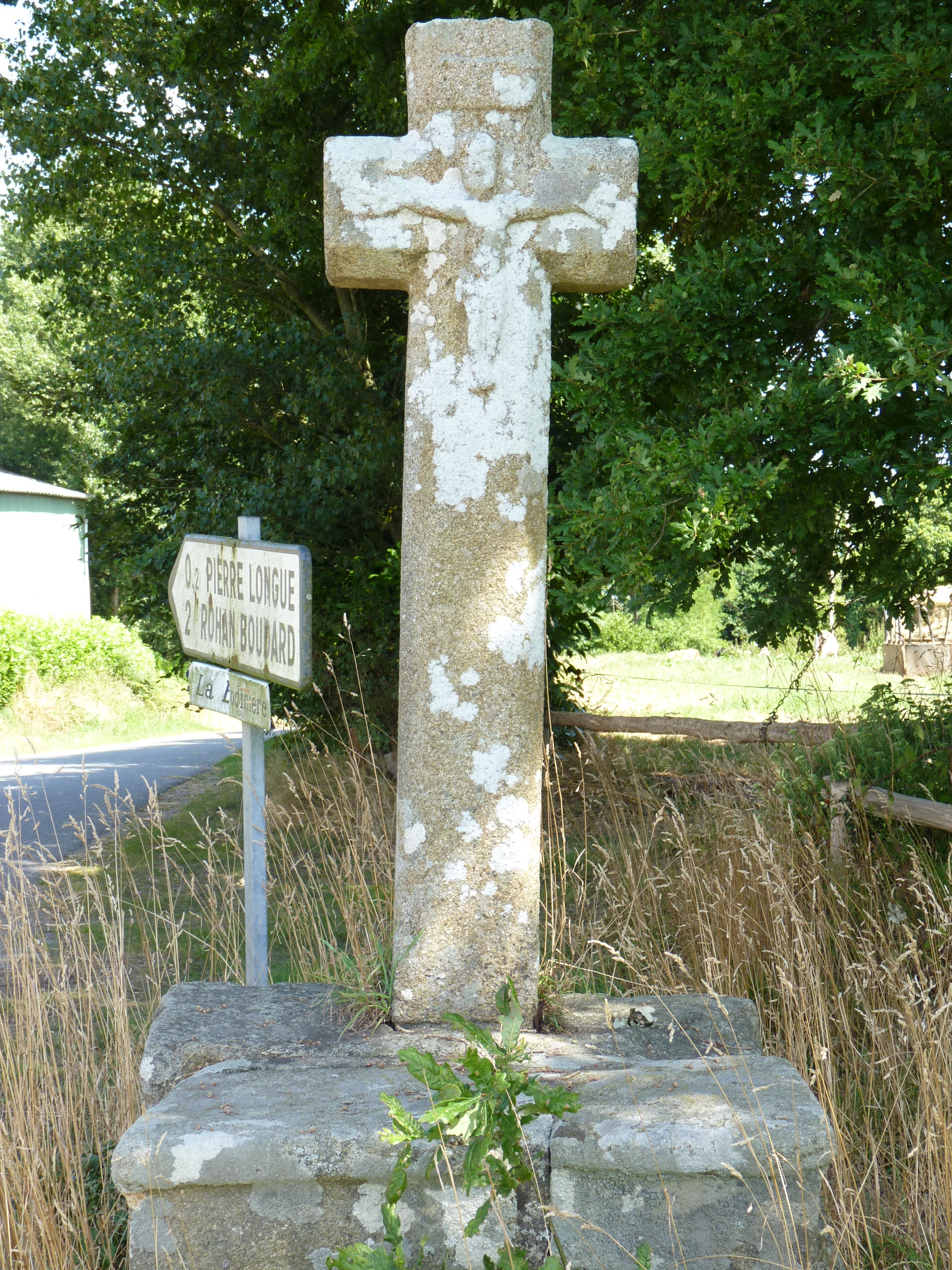

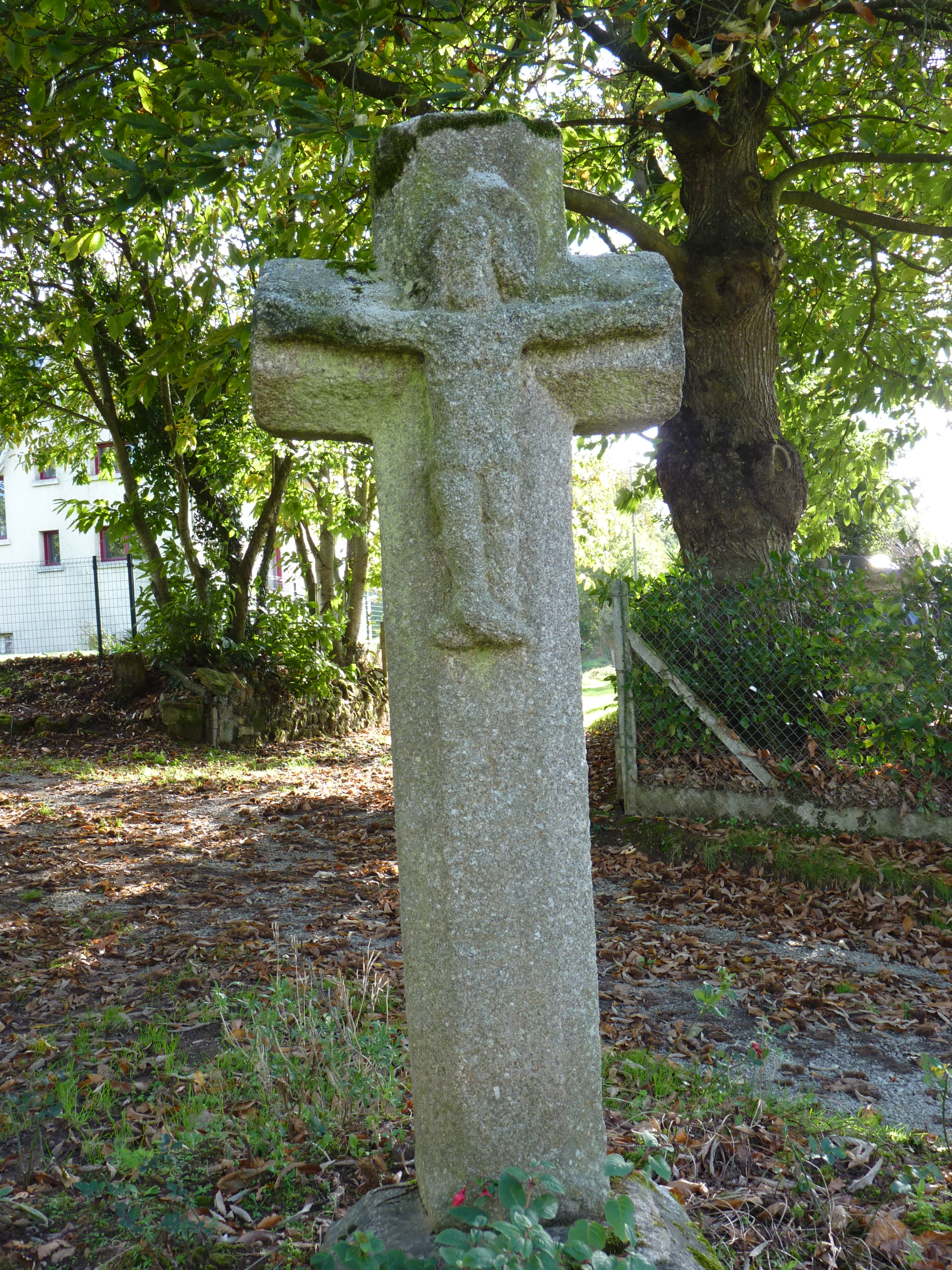

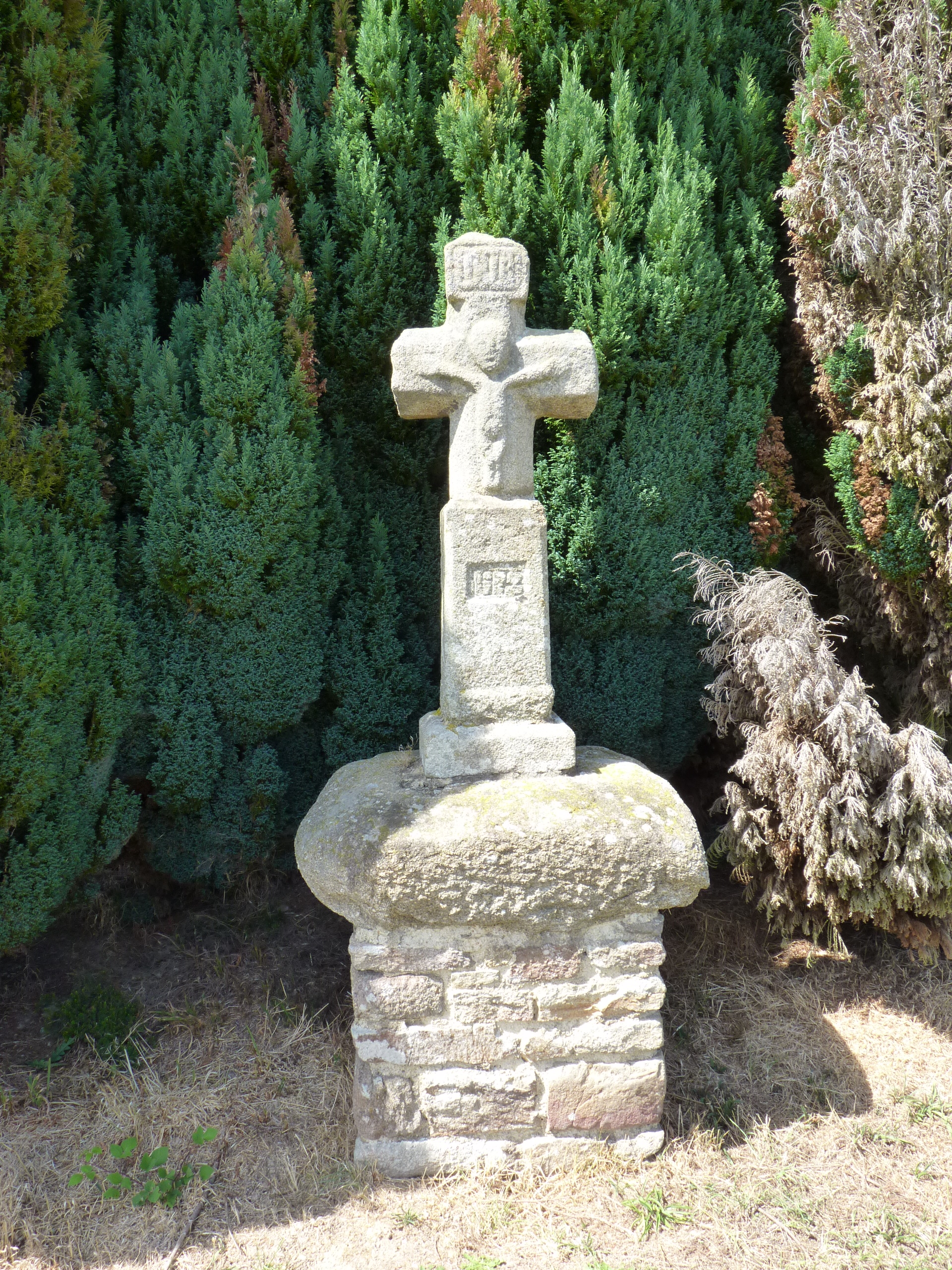

== See also ==
- Communes of the Côtes-d'Armor department
