= Saint-Maudan =

Saint-Maudan Sant-Maodan
- Commune
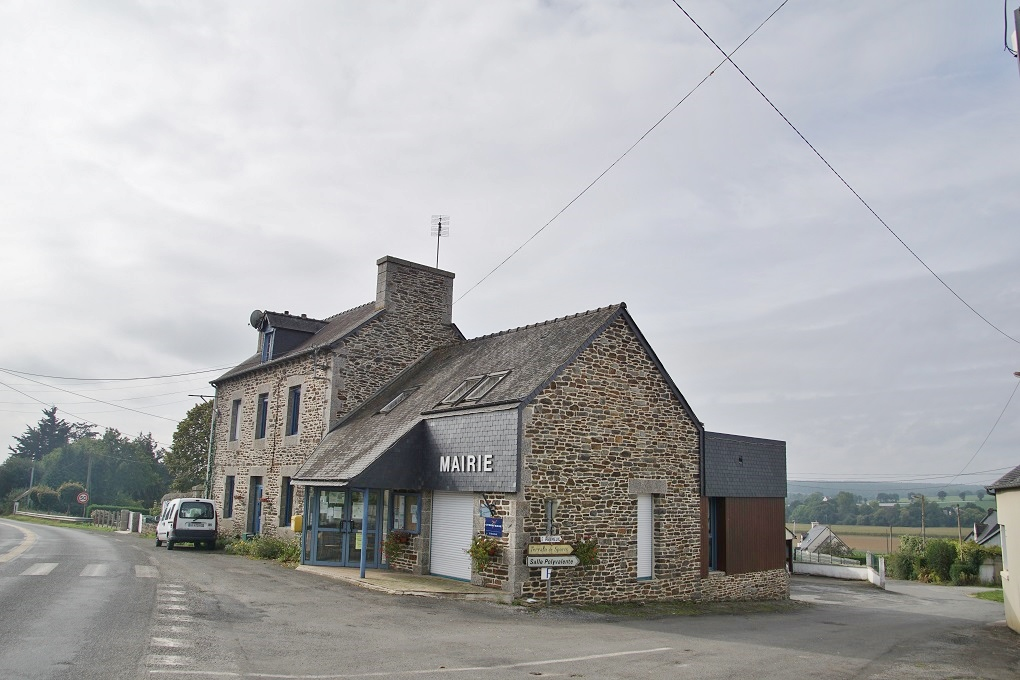
- Town hall.

- Coat of arms
- Location of Saint-Maudan
- Location within France Location within Brittany
- Coordinates: 48°06′51″N 2°46′23″W
- Country: France
- Region: Brittany
- Department: Côtes-d'Armor
- Arrondissement: Saint-Brieuc
- Canton: Loudéac
- Intercommunality: Loudéac Communauté - Bretagne Centre

Government
  - Mayor (2020–2026): Maryline Jaouen
- Area^{1}: 6.67 km^{2} (2.58 sq mi)
- Highest elevation: 146 m (479 ft)
- Lowest elevation: 65 m (213 ft)
- Population (2023): 399
  - Density: 59.8/km^{2} (155/sq mi)
- Time zone: UTC+01:00 (CET)
  - Summer (DST): UTC+02:00 (CEST)
- INSEE/Postal code: 22314 /22600
- ^{1} French Land Register data, which excludes lakes, ponds, glaciers > 1 km^{2} (0.386 sq mi or 247 acres) and river estuaries.

Saint-Maudan (French pronunciation: [sɛ̃ modɑ̃]; Breton: Sant-Maodan) is a commune in the Côtes-d'Armor department of Brittany in northwestern France.

== Population ==
Historical population
Year	Pop.	±% p.a.
1968	274	—
1975	275	+0.05%
1982	324	+2.37%
1990	404	+2.80%
1999	411	+0.19%
2007	407	−0.12%
2012	380	−1.36%
2017	400	+1.03%
2023	399	−0.04%
Source: INSEE

Inhabitants of Saint-Maudan are called meldanais or maudanais in French.

== See also ==
- Communes of the Côtes-d'Armor department
