= Saint-Étienne-du-Gué-de-l'Isle =

Saint-Étienne-du-Gué-de-l'Isle Sant-Stefan-ar-Roudouz
- Commune
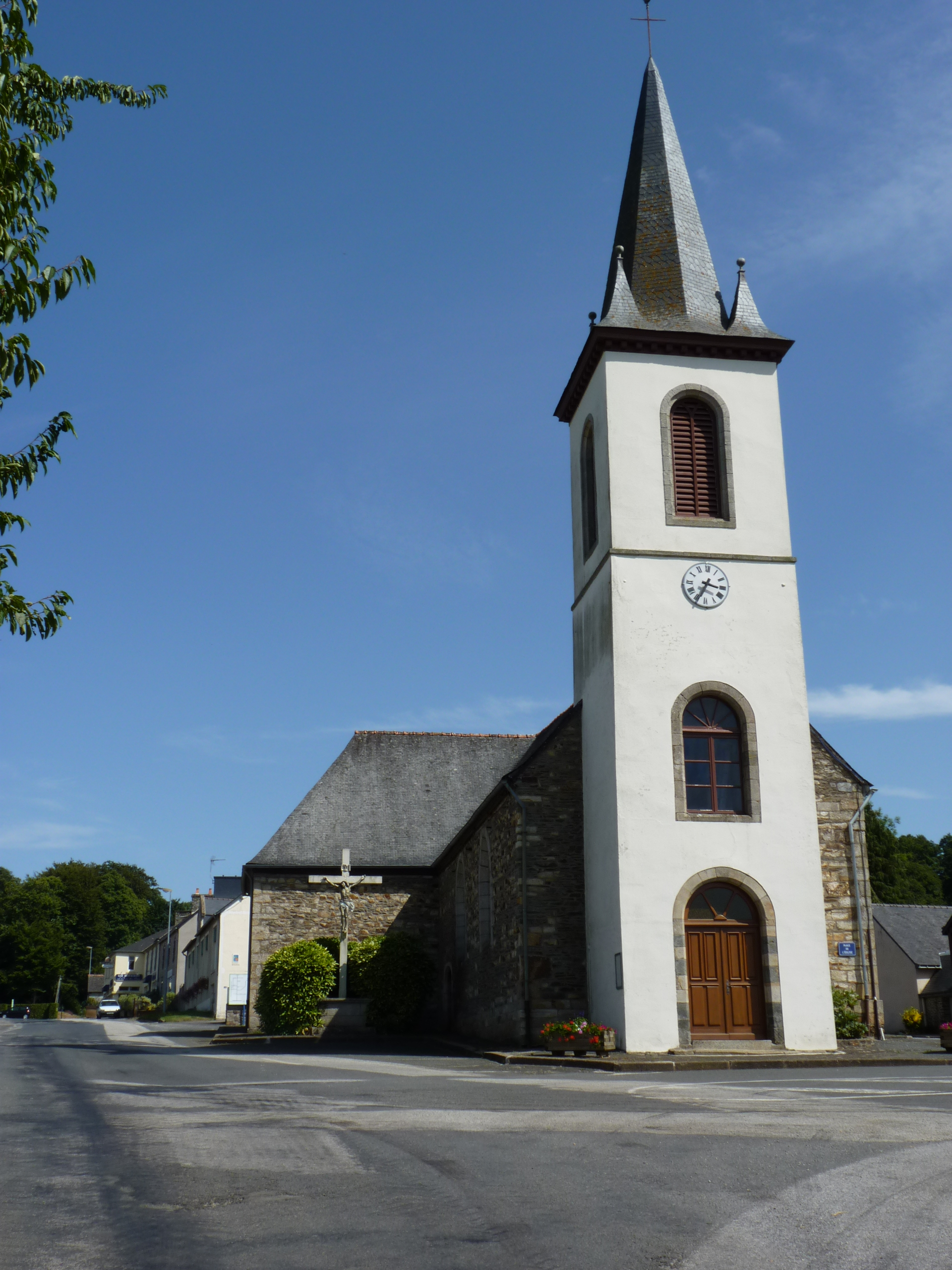
- The church of Saint-Étienne, in Saint-Étienne-du-Gué-de-l'Isle

- Coat of arms
- Location of Saint-Étienne-du-Gué-de-l'Isle
- Location within France Location within Brittany
- Coordinates: 48°06′16″N 2°38′47″W
- Country: France
- Region: Brittany
- Department: Côtes-d'Armor
- Arrondissement: Saint-Brieuc
- Canton: Loudéac
- Intercommunality: Loudéac Communauté - Bretagne Centre

Government
  - Mayor (2020–2026): Pierre Pichard
- Area^{1}: 14.91 km^{2} (5.76 sq mi)
- Highest elevation: 147 m (482 ft)
- Lowest elevation: 52 m (171 ft)
- Population (2023): 372
  - Density: 24.9/km^{2} (64.6/sq mi)
- Time zone: UTC+01:00 (CET)
  - Summer (DST): UTC+02:00 (CEST)
- INSEE/Postal code: 22288 /22210
- ^{1} French Land Register data, which excludes lakes, ponds, glaciers > 1 km^{2} (0.386 sq mi or 247 acres) and river estuaries.

Saint-Étienne-du-Gué-de-l'Isle (French pronunciation: [sɛ̃.t‿etjɛn dy ɡe də lil]; Breton: Sant-Stefan-ar-Roudouz) is a commune in the Côtes-d'Armor department of Brittany in northwestern France.

== Population ==
Historical population
Year	Pop.	±% p.a.
1968	507	—
1975	459	−1.41%
1982	452	−0.22%
1990	417	−1.00%
1999	378	−1.09%
2007	404	+0.83%
2012	379	−1.27%
2017	356	−1.24%
2023	372	+0.74%
Source: INSEE

Inhabitants of Saint-Étienne-du-Gué-de-l'Isle are called stéphanois in French.

== See also ==
- Communes of the Côtes-d'Armor department
