= Lewis and Clark Landing =

Public park in Omaha, Nebraska, United States

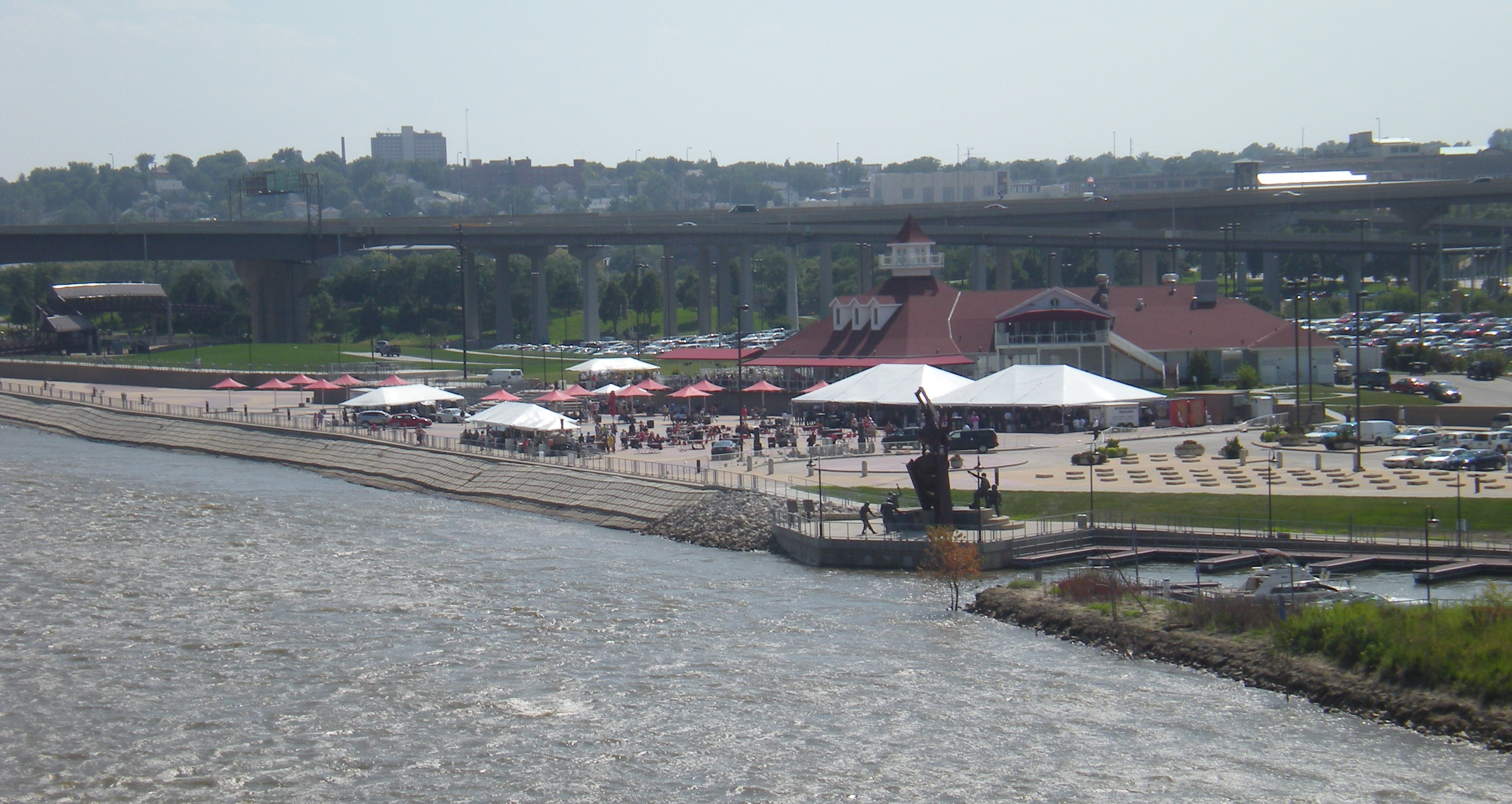
- Lewis and Clark Landing along the Missouri River
- Interactive map of Lewis and Clark Landing
- Type: Municipal
- Location: Downtown Omaha, Nebraska, U.S.
- Coordinates: 41.26296223833292°N 95.92508781877308°W
- Area: 23 acres (9.3 ha)
- Opened: May 3, 2003; August 18, 2023
- Closed: 2020
- Status: Open

Lewis and Clark Landing is a public park located at 515 North Riverfront Drive in Downtown Omaha, Nebraska, United States. The 23-acre (9.3 ha) park is situated along the eight-foot-tall (2.4 m) river walk of the Missouri River just north of U.S. Interstate 480. The park was announced in 2000 and opened on May 3, 2003. The park closed for renovations in 2020 and reopened on August 18, 2023.

== History ==
Lewis and Clark Landing was announced alongside a plan to build an office building to serve as the Midwest headquarters for the National Park Service. The park was originally known as Union Labor Plaza and was built on the site of the former Arasco refinery. The name would later be changed to Lewis and Clark Landing in June 2001.

In 2002, plans were announced to add a recreated Lewis and Clark campsite, 64 miles (103 km) trail near the Missouri River in Nebraska and Iowa, which would utilize the then-under construction Bob Kerrey Pedestrian Bridge. Lewis and Clark Landing officially opened on May 3, 2003.

In 2018, a downtown revitalization program was announced. It would update Gene Leahy Mall, Heartland of America Park, and Lewis and Clark Landing. The park closed in 2020 for renovations. Lewis and Clark Landing officially reopened on August 18, 2023.

== Features ==
The park has a number of distinct features including as a walking trail which follows the riverfront and a bike trail which takes riders west to Miller's Landing and another trail which leads to the Heartland of America Park. The Martin Luther King Jr. Pedestrian Bridge, with interpretive exhibits, connects to CHI Health Center. The park also includes the Omaha Firefighter's Memorial Monument and the second largest labor monument in the United States.

The park contains a walking trail which follows the riverfront and sections of a bike trail that connect to Omaha's bike trail system. The walking trail also connects to the Bob Kerrey Pedestrian Bridge that spans the river and joins Omaha with Council Bluffs, Iowa. Additional attractions include a "Monument to Labor" sculpture, Lewis and Clark interpretive exhibits and a historical marker on site.

The park is immediately down the trail from Omaha's new National Park Service Regional Headquarters. The office houses the superintendent of the Lewis and Clark National Historic Trail.

== See also ==
- Parks in Omaha, Nebraska
- History of Omaha, Nebraska
