= Saint-Barnabé =

Saint-Barnabé Sant-Barnev
- Commune
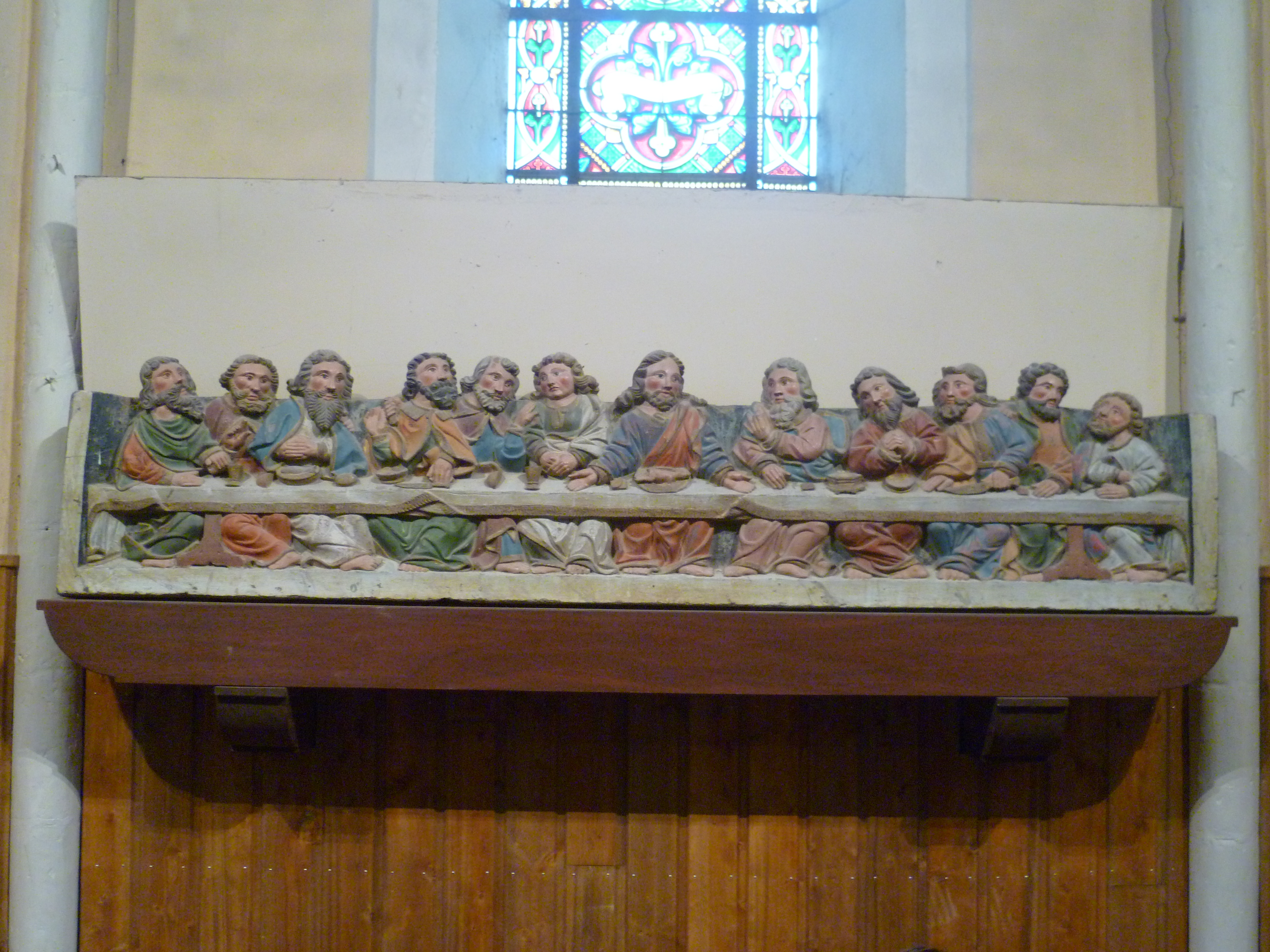
- The Last Supper, in the church of Saint-Barnabé
- Location of Saint-Barnabé
- Location within France Location within Brittany
- Coordinates: 48°08′18″N 2°42′05″W
- Country: France
- Region: Brittany
- Department: Côtes-d'Armor
- Arrondissement: Saint-Brieuc
- Canton: Loudéac
- Intercommunality: Loudéac Communauté - Bretagne Centre

Government
  - Mayor (2020–2026): Georges Le Franc
- Area^{1}: 22.75 km^{2} (8.78 sq mi)
- Highest elevation: 173 m (568 ft)
- Lowest elevation: 72 m (236 ft)
- Population (2023): 1,223
  - Density: 53.76/km^{2} (139.2/sq mi)
- Time zone: UTC+01:00 (CET)
  - Summer (DST): UTC+02:00 (CEST)
- INSEE/Postal code: 22275 /22600
- ^{1} French Land Register data, which excludes lakes, ponds, glaciers > 1 km^{2} (0.386 sq mi or 247 acres) and river estuaries.

Saint-Barnabé (French pronunciation: [sɛ̃ baʁnabe]; Breton: Sant-Barnev) is a commune in the Côtes-d'Armor department of Brittany in northwestern France.

== Population ==
Inhabitants of Saint-Barnabé are called barnabéens in French.

== Map ==
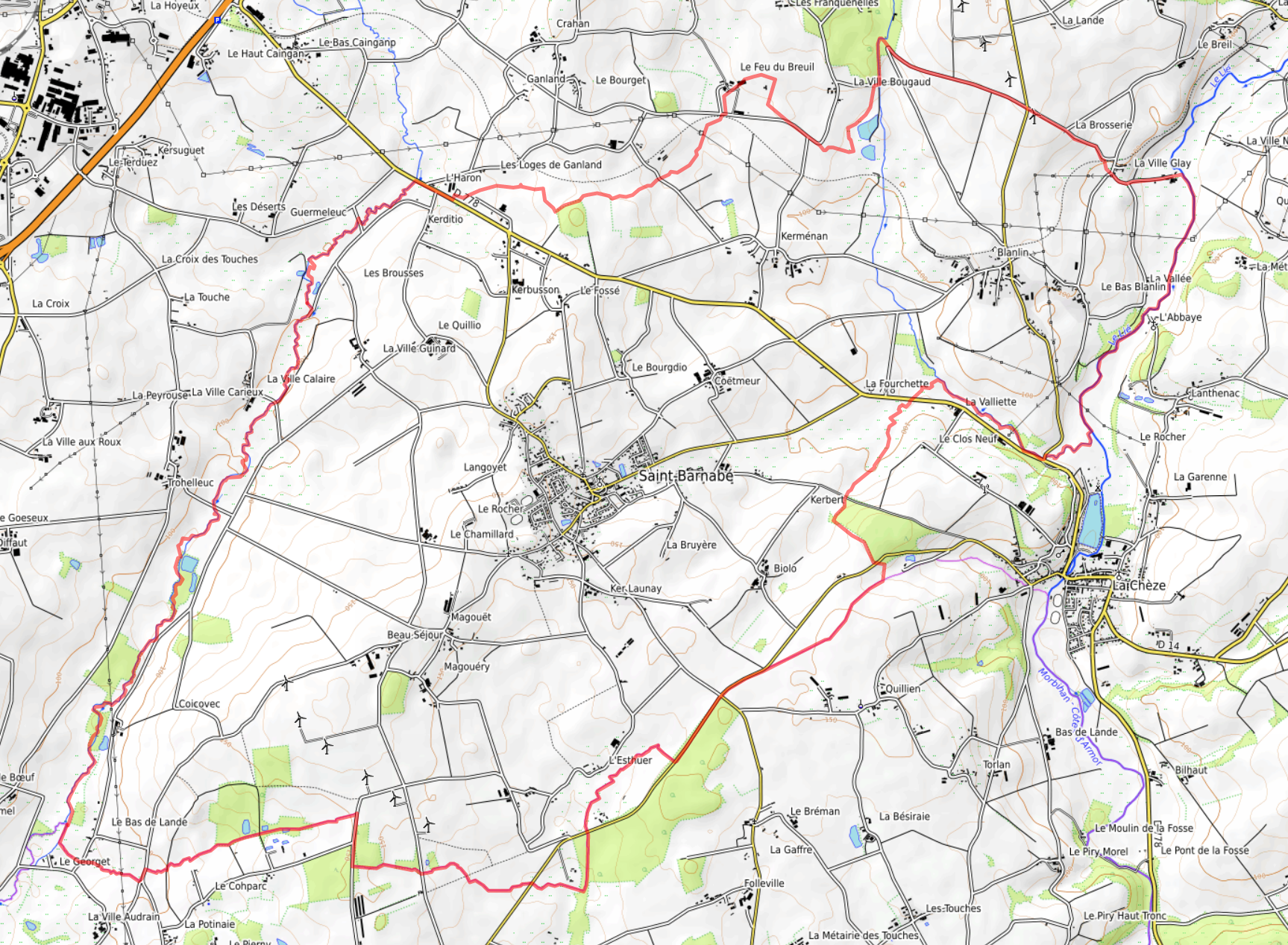
Topographic map

== See also ==
- Communes of the Côtes-d'Armor department
