= Heartland of America Park =

Public park in Omaha, Nebraska, U.S.

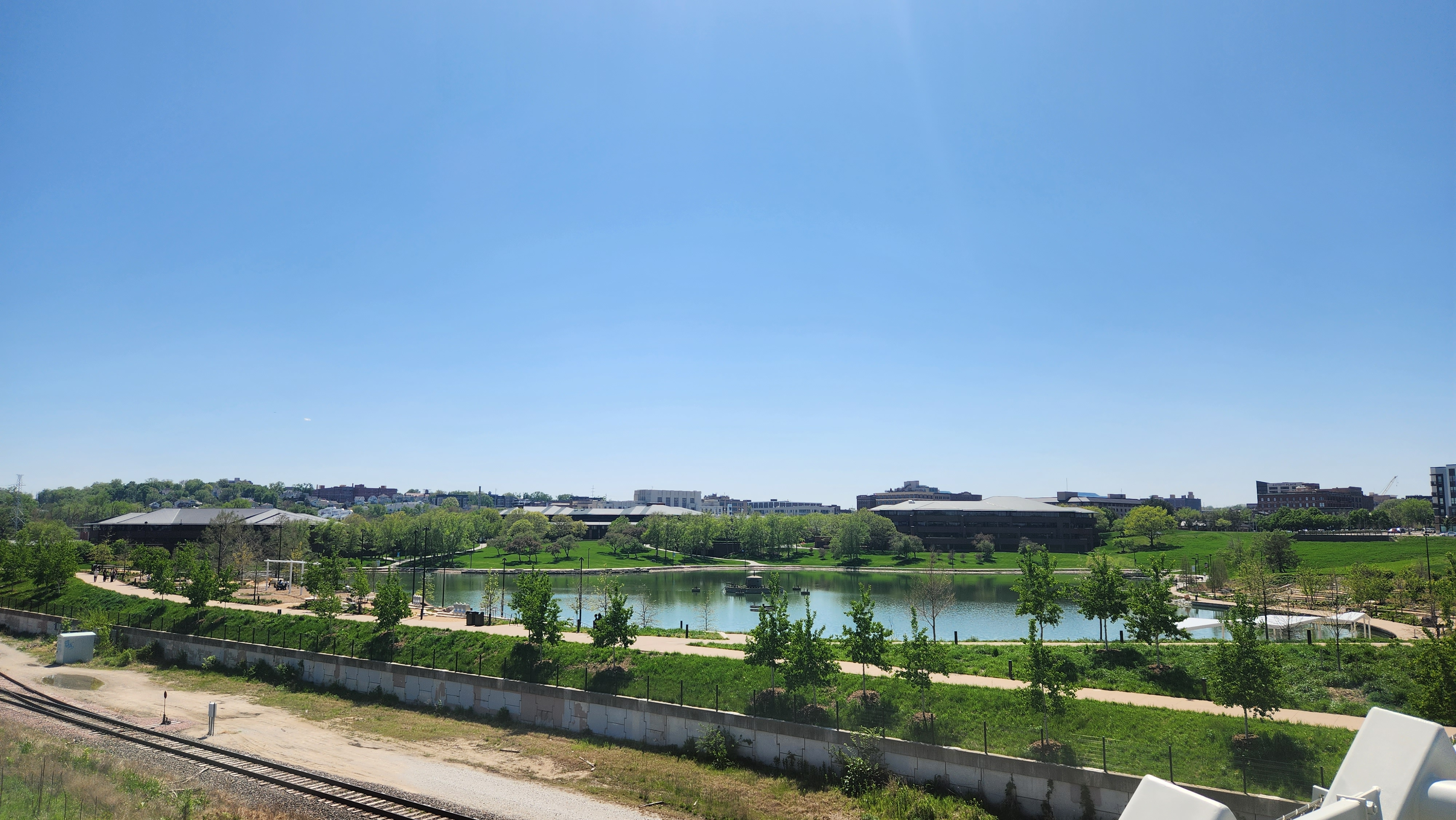
- Heartland of America Park as viewed from Farnam Pier
- Interactive map of Heartland of America Park
- Type: Public
- Location: 800 Douglas St., Omaha, Nebraska, U.S.
- Coordinates: 41.256721812613826°N 95.92505903921972°W
- Opened: September 1990; August 18, 2023
- Closed: 2019

Heartland of America Park is a public park located at 800 Douglas Street in Downtown Omaha, Nebraska, United States. The 31-acre (130,000 m^{2}) park is situated between Interstate 80 and the Missouri River, and it is adjacent to Gene Leahy Mall and the Old Market and connects to Lewis & Clark Landing. The park was announced in 1987 as a part of Conagra's corporate campus. The park officially opened in September 1990. After closing in 2019 due to extensive renovations, the park reopened to the public on August 18, 2023.

== History ==
In August 1987, Conagra, Inc. controversially announced that it would move its headquarters to the site of the Jobbers Canyon Historic District. With the headquarters buildings, Conagra also announced a public park as an extension to the Central Park Mall. In January 1988, plans were revised, adding a lake to the park. The project was originally known as Central Park East and construction began in 1989.

In September 1989, it was reported that due to heavy rain and lead contamination, filling of the lake was delayed. In January 1990, a pedestrian bridge was added, connecting Central Park East to Central Park Mall. In May 1990, a fountain was added. Additionally, the park was renamed to Heartland of America Park. The park officially opened in September 1990.

In 2015, Conagra announced it would move its world headquarters to Chicago, Illinois. Three years later, Conagra announced that it would begin to redevelop parts of the campus and the park, including adding apartments. One project, Brickline at the Mercantile, opened in 2023.

In 2018, a $300 million downtown revitalization program was announced for Gene Leahy Mall, Lewis and Clark Landing, and Heartland of America Park. The park closed later that year for renovations. Renovations added the Farnam Pier, a pier that allowed for viewing over the Missouri River. Additionally, a skating rink. Heartland of America Park re-opened on August 18, 2023.

== Design ==
Heartland of America Park is 31-acre (130,000 m^{2}) large and directly borders the Missouri River. The park includes Conagra Lake, Farnam Pier, and an all-season skating ring. Farnam Pier extends 200 feet into the Missouri River. Conagra Lake includes two fountains, a 250 foot (76 m) fountain and the Florence Fountain. The Florence Fountain was built in 1889 and was put in Heartland of America Park in 1990.

== See also ==
- Parks in Omaha, Nebraska
