= Little Brazil (band) =

- Origin: Omaha, Nebraska, United States
- Genres: Indie rock
- Years active: 2002–present
- Labels: Mt. Fuji Records, Anodyne Records

Little Brazil is a four-piece rock band formed in 2002 in Omaha, Nebraska by Landon Hedges of Desaparecidos and formerly of The Good Life. Originally he intended to use the name Little Brazil for his solo work, yet he recruited his friends Dan Maxwell on bass and Corey Broman on drums, who were in Secret Behind Sunday and Son, Ambulance. The last member was guitarist Austin Britton, who Landon met at an open mic night.

Greg Edds was later added to guitar duties and Oliver Morgan on drums from 2004–2012. Morgan left the group in 2012, being replaced by Matt Baum of Desaparecidos for one performance. Matt Bowen played drums from 2014–2016. In 2014, Mike Friedman took over lead guitar along with drummer Nate Van Fleet joining in 2016. By the time of Send the Wolves (2018), Shawn Cox had replaced Friedman on lead guitar.

Little Brazil has played alongside bands such as The Good Life, Cursive, Make Believe, The Meat Puppets, Nada Surf, The Thermals, and Tegan and Sara.

== Band members ==
- Landon Hedges
- Danny Maxwell
- Shawn Cox
- Nate Van Fleet

=== Former members ===
- Mike Friedman
- Matt Bowen
- Greg Edds
- Oliver Morgan
- Austin Britton
- Corey Broman

== Discography ==
- Little Brazil EP (2004 · Mt. Fuji Records)
- You and Me (2005 · Mt. Fuji Records)
- Tighten the Noose (2007 · Mt. Fuji Records)
- Son (2009 · Anodyne Records)
- Send the Wolves (2018 · Max Trax Records)
- Just Leave (2022 · Max Trax Records)

== See also ==
- Desaparecidos
- The Good Life
- Son, Ambulance
