= National Orchestra Service =

The National Orchestra Service, Inc. (NOS), was the most important booking and management agency for territory bands across the Great Plains and other regions from the early 1930s through 1960. NOS managed black, white and integrated orchestras and was headquartered in Omaha.

== About ==
National Orchestra Service specialized in booking ballroom dance orchestras known as territory bands. The company's reputation as the premier booking agent in that genre helped them dominate their industry for almost 20 years. Bands that NOS represented were typically smaller than the Glenn Miller-type orchestras, usually featuring about 12 pieces, sometimes 15; though ensemble sizes tended to wax and wane with the economy. NOS handled bookings in Wisconsin, Minnesota, North Dakota, South Dakota, Montana, Wyoming, Nebraska, Missouri, Kansas, Oklahoma, and military bases.

== History ==
February 1930 — National Orchestra Service was founded in Omaha. Serl Frank Hutton was its founder and sole proprietor until 1952, when Lee Williams joined as a partner.

By way of merger with Music Management Service in January 1954, Royce Stoenner and David Wenrich, who formed Music Management Service, joined NOS as salaried employees. In September 1959, Royce Stoenner left the NOS agency to join as a 50% partner with the Dave Brumitt Agency, a territory band booking agency in Atlanta.

In 1939, the NOS headquarters at located at 709 World-Herald Building, Omaha, NE. (Note: The Omaha World-Herald Building, during this era was the building designed by Thomas Rogers Kimball and built in 1915.) Later, NOS moved to the eleventh floor — the top floor — of the Omaha National Bank Building in Downtown Omaha. The top floor was actually the sixteenth and the address was 1611 City National Bank Bldg.

In August 1943, Lee Williams was the only band working for National Orchestra Service due to war rationing (gasoline, tires, and the like) and shortage of musicians (the draft).

In February 1960, National Orchestra Service, Inc., folded.

== Sleeper buses & trailers ==
Many territory bands from NOS traveled in sleeper trailers connected to tractor-trailer trucks. The most popular sleeper was manufactured by Wilson Trailer Company in Sioux City, IA. They were purchased, owned, and maintained by the orchestras. Lawrence Welk is thought to have been the first to design and use a sleeper.

== Bands under management ==
Bands Managed by National Orchestra Service, Inc.
Name	Notes
Verne Byers	Herbert Daly Phillips played with this band in the early 1950s
"Chan" Chandler and His Orchestra	According to Royce Stoenner, Chandler had the best band ever at NOS and was one of the reasons he was lured to work for NOS. (Note: This claim (that Chan Chandler had the best band, ever, at the NOS) was made by Royce Stoenner and has no published reference. Stoenner made this statement during a phone conversation with an editor October 30, 2009 ("Royce Stoenner Oral History," October 30, 2009)) Former musicians: David F. Barnett (1926–2009); Marjorie King, singer. Chandler, a saxophonist, was known in some quarters as "America's most handsome orchestra leader." Before NOS, Chandler's orchestra had been managed and booked by McConkey Orchestra Company.
Jerry Mosher	
Preston H. Love	NOS became the booking agent for Preston Love in January 1954 by way of merger with Music Management Service, a booking agency founded by Royce Stoenner and David Wenrich.
Del Clayton	Musicians: Harry Bernard Risvold, drummer (1932–2001) — traveled with Clayton for 3 years; Glenna Fraser, singer; John Walter Nelson, Jr., drummer (1930—2006)
Wayne Chapman	Chapman was an organist who once played with Lee Williams
John Paul Jones; Orchestra	
Al Hudson	Hudson was a trumpet player who once played with Lee Williams. His band, essentially, was the former Lee Williams orchestra.
Red Perkins & His Dixie Ramblers	
Larry Elliott	
Carl Colby	
Klif Riggs	
Lee Williams	(né William Brammer Leacox; 1918–1995) Several new bands were launched by Lee Williams. While touring for a half year, he would book the next half, then sell the band and take time off. In 1952, he became a partner with National Orchestra Service (see comments below, under "Principals, employees").
Mickey Bride	The Little Man With a Big Band. Bride was a drummer who once played with Lee Williams
Oklahoma City Blue Devils	NOS launched the Blue Devils on a tour of the Northern Territories in 1930.
Nat Towles and his Quintet	Towels, an African American, played trumpet. His band was one of the best territory bands managed by NOS. Many well-known musicians are alumni of Towels' band.
Sammy Stevens	Stevens was a drummer
Little John Beecher	Beecher, a trumpeter and valve trombonist who once played with Lee Williams, became a singer of novelty songs, leading his own band called "Little John Beecher and his Orchestra" throughout the 1950s. The band finished 1959 using NOS as its booking agent. When Royce Stoenner left NOS and moved to Georgia, Beecher followed and started working there through his agency. Beecher donated his music library to Auburn University before his death.
Jimmy Thomas	
Tommy Allan	An excellent band, Allan played trumpet
Leo Peiper	This band was likely not with NOS (reviewing - Oct 2009) This band was with the McConkey Music Corporation in July 1947. Former musicians: Lauren Brown, trombone (1915–1994)
Jack Russell and His Sweet Rhythmic Orchestra	Roy Turk wrote the words and Fred E. Ahlert wrote the music to Into My Heart, which became the theme song for the Jack Russell's Orchestra.
Billy Thompson and His Melody Cowboys	Not sure whether this band was with NOS (reviewing - Oct 2009)
Tillie Newell and His Orchestra	Not sure whether this band was with NOS (reviewing - Oct 2009)
Walter J. Martie	(b. 1923; d. 1994) Not sure whether this band was with NOS (reviewing - Oct 2009) Former musicians include Art Delaney, Gordon Boore (drummer), and Delores Morgan (singer; née Dolores Helen Morgan; b. 1923; d. 2009). Delores married Walter in the 1940s.
Earl Gardner and His Orchestra	The Band With a Million Friends
Bob Calame and his Music	Robert Marvin Calame (15 Jan 1911 Grand Island, Nebraska – 3 Sep 1967 Omaha, Nebraska) wrote the music for Lawrence Welk's theme song, "Bubbles in the Wine." Calame's band played a sweet style, similar to Lawrence Welk. His daughter lives in Omaha.

== See also ==
- Music of Omaha
- Culture of North Omaha, Nebraska
- National Ballroom Operators Association
