= Stewart "Dirk" Fischer =

- Birth name: Stewart Roussin Fischer
- Also known as: Dirk Fischer, Dirty Dirk Fischer
- Born: September 1, 1924; Durand, Michigan, U.S.
- Origin: Muskegon, Michigan
- Died: February 25, 2013 (aged 88); Valencia, California
- Genres: Jazz, swing
- Occupation(s): Musician, arranger
- Instrument(s): Trumpet, valve trombone
- Years active: 1940s–2013
- Formerly of: Teddy Philips, Little John Beecher Orchestra, Joe Vera Latin Ensemble, Walter Martie, John Paul Jones, Lee Williams

Stewart Roussin Fischer (September 1, 1924 – February 25, 2013) known professionally as Dirk Fischer or Dirty Dirk Fischer was an American composer, arranger, educator, trumpeter, and valve trombonist. Before moving to California in 1959, he spent his young adulthood in the Northern Plains, performing with and writing for territory bands booked out of Omaha, Nebraska. He was the brother of Clare Fischer.

Fischer was a faculty member at College of the Canyons, as Jazz Band Director and Instructor of Jazz Studies, from 1977 to 2005.

== Growing up ==
Fischer was born in 1924 in Durand, Michigan. His mother, Luella Blanche Roussin, was of French descent, and his father, Cecil Harold Fischer, was of German descent. Both were born in Canada at the turn of the 20th century. Fischer was the oldest of four children. One of his brothers was Clare Fischer. His mother played piano, his father played banjo, and his uncle played C melody saxophone. There was always music in his house.

Fischer began playing the trumpet at age 13 and then saxophone the following year. His mother nicknamed him "Dirk" when he was 13. While playing in territory bands, friends endearingly called him "Dirty Dirk." Fischer graduated from South High School in Grand Rapids, Michigan

Before being drafted, Fischer and three friends formed a quartet called the Aristocats that played at Club Cherrio in Muskegon, Michigan. The band included Rich Henry (alto), Hamilton Allen (piano), and Mike Balish (drums).

== Army years ==
During World War II, Fischer was drafted and served three years in the U.S. Army where he worked his way up to the Army Service Forces Bands. He entered the Army at Camp Barkley, Texas, near Abilene, where after basic training he enrolled in cooks-and-baker school. While working for a company kitchen, he began playing saxophone and trumpet with the local Medical Replacement Training Center Band. The Army transferred him from the kitchen to the band. He formed a lifelong friendship with jazz saxophonist and clarinetist Al Drootin from Boston. On the recommendation of a warrant officer who led an Army band at Camp Reynolds, Pennsylvania, a general changed Fischer's transfer overseas and sent him instead to Camp Lee, Virginia, home of the band training unit for the Armed Forces. Fischer spent six months at Fort Lee where instructors such as Gil Evans and Sanford ("Sandy") J. Siegelstein were assigned. The Camp housed two hundred and fifty Allied Forces musicians. Although Fischer took a course in arranging from Evans, who had been drafted, he already knew and practiced what Evans was teaching. Fischer was a member of a black military big band in Pennsylvania. When the Army segregated soldiers by race, music helped him bridge the gap.

1944 Photo, Victory News, Camp Reynolds, Pennsylvania — 331st Army Service Forces Jazz Ensemble, Camp Reynolds — When a black warrant officer wondered what that white guy was doing in the trumpet section, CWO (band director) Taylor (bandleader) said, "Can't you tell?" Trumpets: Richard Clark, Dirk Fischer, Oscar Gamby, Jr., Horace Sullivan Lee Turner; Saxophones: Unknown, Henry Kirkland, Jon Micheaux (Bari); Drums: James W. Barnes

== Territory bands ==
Under the G.I. Bill, Fischer studied trumpet with Daniel Benner Tetzlaff and orchestration with William Muelbe. Both were members of the Minneapolis Symphony. He studied tonal materials with Jack Nowicki, who had studied with Paul Hindemith and Joseph Shillinger, and 20th Century counterpoint with Ernst Krenek.

Early in his career, Fischer played trumpet and valve trombone in several territory bands, all booked out of Omaha by the National Orchestra Service, including the Teddy Philips band, Little John Beecher Orchestra, Joe Vera Latin Ensemble, Walter Martie, John Paul Jones, and Lee Williams. These bands became the outlet for his arrangements and compositions during the late 1940s and 1950s. He directed some shows, wrote most of the "special" arrangements, and drove the sleeper bus. He was also road manager for John Beecher. In 1959 he left the Beecher band when the National Orchestra service was going out of business.

== Living in California ==
Fischer arrived in Los Angeles in 1959. He spent the next six years working in recording studios, ghost writing for other composers and arrangers. Having been separated from his first wife for some time, his second wife appeared at the Rams Restaurant, in Los Angeles, where Fischer was working. Fischer hired her in November 1965, and they were married on September 5, 1966. They opened the Owl Coffee Shop in Van Nuys and ran it for fourteen years. The business allowed him to go to music school and his wife to enter nursing school. After transferring credits earned on the GI bill from a college in Minnesota, Fischer earned credits from Cal State Los Angeles and Cal State Northridge to complete a California Teaching Credential.

In the 1970s, jazz studies was only beginning to enter traditional music pedagogy. Finding qualified teachers, those at the pinnacle of their field, meant having to draw from the jazz profession rather than academia. The College of the Canyons found Fischer by accident. At the suggestion of his wife, Fischer visited the college as a way to play music and meet others with his interest. In 1977, he became the first Instructor of Jazz Studies at College of the Canyons. He led the college's first annual RK Downs Jazz Festival.

== Personal life ==
Fischer had two sons and a daughter from his first marriage to Lula Frances Leak (b. 1930, married 1948, divorced August 1966, Los Angeles). Fischer had stepsons and a son from his second marriage of 40 years to Rosalindo ("Roz") Joyce Fischer, former surname Satin, née Baum (b. 1938 - d. 2005). They were married in Las Vegas on September 5, 1966.

Fischer died on February 25, 2013, in Valencia, California. Before his death, he suffered from colon cancer.

== Discography ==
- Thesaurus, Clare Fischer Big Band (Discovery, 1968)
- George Stone & Friends Perform the Music of Stewart "Dirk" Fischer (Sea Breeze, 2004)
- Coming of Age, Dirk Fischer and George Stone, (Sea Breeze, 2011)

== Compositions ==
- "Funquiado" (Clare Fischer, arr. D. Fischer)

UNC Jazz Press

- "Gaviota" (Clare Fischer, arr. D. Fischer)

UNC Jazz Press

- "Pensativa" (Clare Fischer, arr. D. Fischer)

UNC Jazz Press

- "Whisper Not" † (Benny Golson, arr. D. Fisher)
- "Coco B" (Clare Fischer, arr. D. Fischer)

UNC Jazz Press

- "Let Me Count the Ways" † (Victor Feldman, arr. D. Fischer)
- "Melody for Thelma" † (Blue Mitchell, arr. D. Fischer)
- "Our Delight" † (Tad Dameron, arr. D. Fischer)
- "Donde" (words Barbara Ransom) 1958 | 1992

Walrus Music Publishing

- "Donde" † (instrumental only)

Walrus Music Publishing

- "Cinoton" 1959 | 2007
- "Bitter Leaf: Quintet" 1960 | 2001
- "Calamus" † 1969 | 2001

Walrus Music Publishing

- "Rocl" † 1970 | 2003

Walrus Music Publishing

- "Malookanus Gookum" 1977 | 2007
- "Down, Down, Down" 1977 | 2007
- "Hurry Home" † 1978 | 1995

Walrus Music Publishing

- "And Freckles" † 1978 | 2003

Walrus Music Publishing

- "All Ta' Once" 1979 | 2003

Walrus Music Publishing

- "Sing Dammit!" 1979 | 2003

Walrus Music Publishing

- "Plea for Deductive" † 1980 | 1998

Walrus Music Publishing

- "Escalera" † 1981 | 2003

Walrus Music Publishing

- "Plucky" † 1982 | 1998

Walrus Music Publishing

- "Tonito" † 1982 | 2003

Walrus Music Publishing

- "Omaha Gathering" 1983 | 2007
- "Hamilton Allen Esquire" † 1986 | 1998

Walrus Music Publishing

- "Escalera Numero Dos" 1990 | 2007
- "Heavy Cussin"' 1996 | 2000

Walrus Music Publishing

- "Mambo Estudio" 1997 | 2003

Walrus Music Publishing

- "Conversation" Pending 2007
- "Quartet O' Sax's" Pending 2007
- "Keep Going Charlie"
- "Backup (reserves)" 2004 (big band bossa nova, soprano sax feature)
- "Ghostly Chu" 1995 (big band ballad, alto sax feature)
- "Canto" 2007 (big band bossa nova, trombone feature)

(† On the George Stone Album)

== See also ==
- List of jazz arrangers
