= The Rainbow Ballroom (Denver) =

- Interactive map of The Rainbow Ballroom
- Address: 38 E 5th Avenue; Denver, Colorado
- Coordinates: 39.7239°N 104.9866°W
- Capacity: 3,000

Construction
- Built: 1927; 99 years ago
- Opened: September 16, 1933; 92 years ago
- Closed: 1961; 65 years ago

The Rainbow Ballroom was a dance hall in Denver, Colorado that was one of the best known dance halls west of the Mississippi, according to a 1946 Billboard article. Its capacity of 3,000 made it the largest indoor dance hall in Colorado during its 28 years of existence — from its opening day on September 16, 1933, to its closing day in 1961.

== History ==
In 1933, its owner and charter member of the Midwestern Ballroom Operators' Association (MBOA), Orlaf K. Farr hired Rudolph Michael Schindler, a well-known architect, to convert the existing arena amusement hall that had been built in 1927 into configuration more suitable to accommodate a dance floor. Farr operated Rainbow Ballroom since its opening until selling in December 1946 to Felix Bernard Beyer and James Raymond Norton. Verne Byers, Felix Beyer's son, became manager of the Rainbow Room January 24, 1947. Byers continued the past policy of booking territory bands and name bands. In 1948, James Norton purchased Felix Beyer's interest in the ballroom and then leased it for 10 years to Joseph Leher. At some point in the 1950s, Joseph Leher purchased the Rainbow Ballroom.

In its heyday, the ballroom was open six nights a week, play host venue for national big bands (often referred to as orchestras) and territory bands. The bands included:

- Louis Armstrong's Big Band (with Sid Catlett)
- Clyde Knight Orchestra (1941)
- Les Brown
- Verne Byers and His Orchestra (1949 for 17 weeks)
- Duke Ellington (1952, 53)
- Fletcher Henderson
- Sammy Kaye (Swing and sway with Sammy Kaye and his orchestra)
- Lawrence Welk (1936)
- Wayne King
- Harry James
- Al Sky and His Musical Stars (1930s)
- Little Joe Hart and his Boys (1937)
- Kay Barclay and Her California All-Girl Orchestra (1937)
- Tiny Hill
- Woody Herman
- Bobby Beers
- Don Reid Orchestra
- Billy Eckstine
- Carl (The Squeakin' Deacon) Moore
- Ralph Flanagan Orchestra (1954)
- Joe Houston (1954)
- Benny Goodman
- The Dean Bushnell Orchestra
- Lalo Guerrero
- Stan Kenton (1954)
- Sauter-Finegan Orchestra (1954)
- Bennie Moten (1935)
- Johnny Otis (1954)
- Andy Kirk's Clouds of Joy (with Mary Lou Williams) (1935, 1940)
- Seger Ellis (1940)
- Lefty Frizzell (1953)
- Lionel Hampton
- Gene Ammons
- Illinois Jacquet
- Tab Smith (1955)
- Chuck Berry (1959)
- Dizzy Gillespie and His Orchestra (1959)
- Phil Urso and His Quintet (1959)

=== 1959 race riot ===
In July 1959, a race riot broke out during a Fats Domino concert/dance when an unidentified man kicked over the table of a man and woman who had just finished a dance – the man was African American and the woman was Caucasian. It took more than an hour to quell the disturbance, which drew 18 police patrol cars, three police paddy wagons, and an ambulance. Police estimated that were 2,500 people in the ballroom during the disturbance and that 40 different fights were going on when they arrived. The concert promoter, LeRoy Smith estimated that 1,600 were in attendance and that only 4 fights had broken out. There were no serious injuries or damage to the ballroom. No arrests were made.

=== Closing and current use ===
The Rainbow Ballroom closed in 1961. Subsequent to its closing as a ballroom, the building was used as a demonstration chamber for missiles by Martin Company, then a warehouse. After years of abuse and neglect, the red brick building was renovated in 2002 into offices by the architectural firm of Sink Combs Dethlefs. The renewed facility serves as the national headquarters for the architectural firm and is shared with several businesses. The entrance is at 475 N Lincoln Street.
