= Red Perkins =

- Born: Frank Shelton Perkins; December 26, 1890; Muchakinock, Iowa United States
- Died: September 27, 1976 (aged 85) Minneapolis, Minnesota United States
- Genres: Jazz music Big band
- Occupations: Bandleader; Musician
- Instrument: Trumpet
- Label: Gennett Records
- Formerly of: Red Perkins and His Dixie Ramblers

Frank Shelton "Red" Perkins (December 26, 1890 – September 27, 1976) was an American jazz trumpet player, singer, and bandleader. Perkins led of one of the oldest Omaha, Nebraska-based jazz territory bands, The Dixie Ramblers, and saw his greatest period of success in the 1920s and 1930s.

== Early life ==
Perkins, who was African-American, was born in Muchakinock, Iowa, a coal mining camp near Oskaloosa, Iowa. As an adult, Perkins moved from Oskaloosa to Fort Dodge, Iowa.

In 1917, Perkins moved with his wife and child to Omaha, Nebraska. He got a job as a porter at a barber shop and worked there from 1917 to 1925.

== Career ==
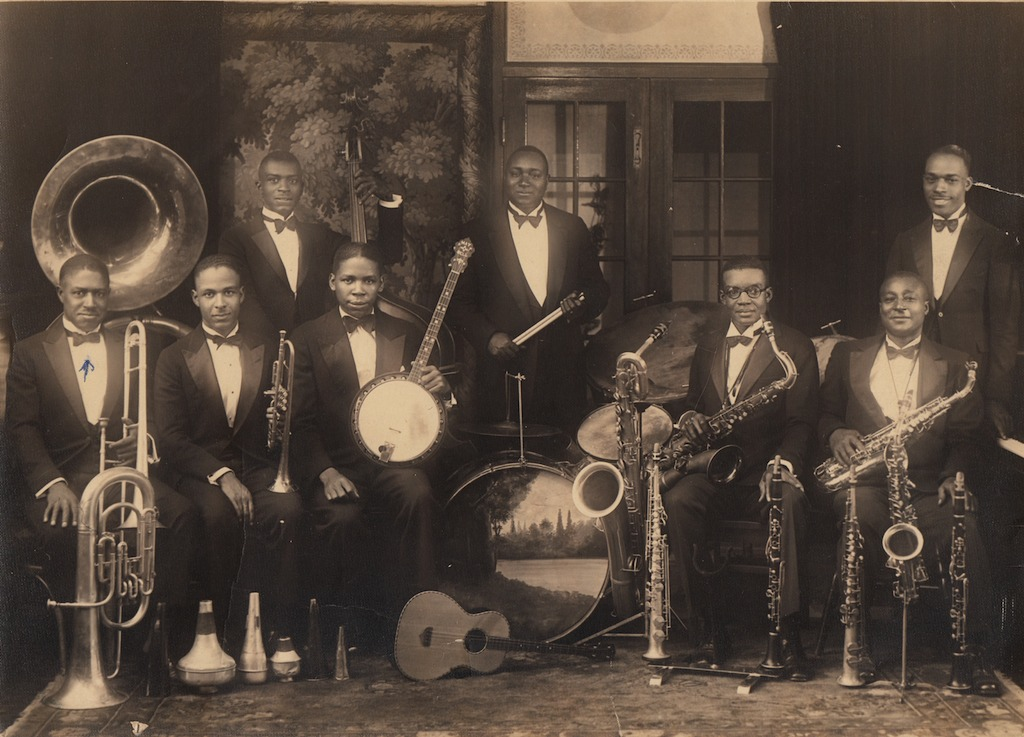
The Dixie Ramblers

In 1923, Perkins took over the Omaha Night Owls jazz band and renamed them the Dixie Ramblers. Perkins based his band in Omaha's Near North Side. It was a small band with six players but several of the musicians doubled on different instruments. The Dixie Ramblers quickly grew into a medium-sized jazz territory band.

The National Orchestra Service booked the band from 1923 into the 1940s. In 1932, he joined with harmonica player O.P. Alexander and they performed on radio station WFAA until 1934. Perkins and his band were signed by RCA Victor in 1936 and later released music on Gennett Records. The band cut more than 250 sides of records. The band played in ballrooms, theaters, and hotels in Nebraska, Iowa, Kansas, South Dakota, and North Dakota.

One of the Dixie Rambler's most famous songs was "Hard Times Stomp." The jazz band was known for its variety acts and floor shows.

Perkins' bookings were handled by National Orchestra Service of Omaha, Nebraska.

== Personal life ==
Towards the end of the big band era in the late 1940s, Perkins moved to Minneapolis, Minnesota, and became a professional photographer. He died September 27, 1976, in Minneapolis, Minnesota.

== Discographical note ==
- 1927-33 VV AA Richmond Rarities (Recorded In Richmond, Indiana 1927-33) (Jazz Oracle BDW80008, ?). Contains the following four trasck as the complete Red Perkins recorded legacy plus Alex Jackson, Alphonse Trent and Zack Whyte's complete recordings.

The Dixie Ramblers recorded only four track for Gennett Records in two different sessions.

- .Richmond, Indiana, May 5, 1931

Frank "Red" Perkins (t, as, ss, v) dir. Joe Drake (t, cl, ts, arr), Andre C. Oglesby (tb), Jesse Simmons (cl, as, ts), Howard Fields (p), Charles “Goodie” Watkins (bjo, gtr), Eugene Freels (t, bb), Harry Rooks (d-x), trio (v).
17727-A: "Hard Times Stomp" (Perkins) Ch 4004
17728-A: "My Baby Knows How" (Davis-Akst-Richman) - vFP Ch 16661
- Red Perkins and His Dixie RamblersRichmond, Indiana, May 6, 1931
17729-A: "Old Man Blues" (Paul, Ellington, Mills) - v3 Ch 40044
17730: "Minor Blues" (Perkins) Ch 16288
