= Robert E. Freed =

American businessman

Robert E. Freed (May 4, 1919 – July 17, 1974) was an American entertainment mogul and prominent civil rights leader in the state of Utah.

== Biography ==
Robert E. Freed was born May 4, 1919, in Salt Lake City, Utah, one of four sons of Lester D. and Jasmine Young Freed, along with David L., Daniel and Peter. He married JoAnn Robinson on March 25, 1950, in Salt Lake City, and they had four sons, Mark, John, Paul and Christopher.

A lifetime resident of Utah, Freed was an active participant in the civic and political affairs of the state. Graduating from the University of Utah with high honors, he was invited to membership in Phi Kappa Phi. He majored in education with a degree in speech and theater. He was a co-founder of the Salt Lake Playbox Theatre in 1938 with Robert Hyde Wilson.

Freed served in the infantry for five years during World War II and received a battlefield commission, Purple Heart and the Bronze Star with Oak Leaf Cluster. He left the service in 1946 with the rank of First Lieutenant. After the war, he entered into an agreement to lease the Lagoon Amusement Park, in Farmington, Utah, and in 1946, became operational manager of it. Later, he became general manager with the position expanded to include the Terrace Ballroom and associated companies. It was under Freed's direction that Lagoon's major expansions were made. Together with his brothers, he rescued Lagoon from the brink of collapse and helped develop it into a first-class family amusement resort.

In 1963, Freed became president of the International Association of Amusement Parks (IAAP). He served as president of the National Ballroom Operators Association in 1965, and received many service awards from these two organizations.

The award which gave Freed his greatest satisfaction was the one presented to him by the Utah Chapter of the National Association for the Advancement of Colored People, the "Human Rights" award, making him the first life-member of this organization in Utah. Freed was fiercely dedicated to the causes of equality; when the Freed family and their partner, Ranch Kimball, took over the lease of Lagoon, the terms forbade blacks in the swimming pool and the ballroom in accordance with a Farmington town ordinance. By the late 1940s, Robert Freed had succeeded in fully opening Lagoon to blacks; and when his company acquired the Rainbow Gardens, later known as the Terrace Ballroom, the same policy was adopted. Freed once said, "One of the most satisfying experiences of my life was long ago, before civil rights. Legislation was passed, when Lagoon opened its doors to people of all races." In 1965, he was chairman of the Utah State Advisory Committee to the United States Commission on Civil Rights, and had served as president of the United Nations of Utah. He had also been treasurer of the Salt Lake County Republican Central committee for eight years.

Freed was a life member of the Actor's Fund of America and established the Lagoon Opera House as a part of his commitment to theater. In addition, Freed was a member of the Alumni Board of the University of Utah, the Salt Lake Chamber of Commerce and the University Club.

He died on July 17, 1974, in Salt Lake City of cancer.
