= John Hubbard Beecher =

American jazz musician

- Also known as: Little John Beecher
- Born: February 8, 1927; Marshalltown, Iowa, U.S.
- Died: August 6, 1987 (aged 60) Muscogee County, Georgia, U.S.
- Genres: Jazz, novelty music, nonet
- Instrument: Trumpet

John Hubbard Beecher, also known as Little John Beecher (February 8, 1927 – August 6, 1987) was an American bandleader, jazz trumpeter and valve trombonist, and a singer of novelty songs. His band, Little John Beecher and his Orchestra, was active throughout the 1950s, and was booked by National Orchestra Service of Omaha, Nebraska. Before forming his own band, he played trumpet with Lee Williams.

== Career ==
Beecher founded and served as bandleader of Little John Beecher and His Orchestra throughout the 1950s. The orchestra was a nonet plus a featured vocalist territory band. Beecher was a large man, weighing 300 pounds in 1955. He promoted the catchphrase "THE BAND with the big front." Beecher booked his gigs through the National Orchestra Service ("NOS"), a territory band agency in Omaha, Nebraska. Royce Stoenner, who had been an executive at NOS, left the agency in 1959 to become a partner with the Dave Brumitt Agency, a territory band booking agency in Atlanta. Beecher followed Stoenner to Georgia and started working through his agency. Shortly thereafter in 1959, the band ended.

Jimmy Fuller founded The Cavaliers Orchestra in 1946 and served as bandleader until 1976. Having played trumpet with the Cavaliers since 1973, Beecher became its second bandleader in the spring of 1976. The band was based in Columbus, Georgia.

== Former members of Beecher's Orchestra ==
- 1959–1960: Travis Wayne Jenkins, tenor sax (May 23, 1939 Hockley County, Texas – January 11, 2004 Bangkok, Thailand)
- 1950s: Betty Jordan, vocals
- Stewart "Dirk" Fischer
- Richard "Dick" Vaughn Busey, tenor sax (born 1931)
- Russ Long, piano (né Russell V. Longstreth March 9, 1939 – December 31, 2006)
- Robert Fisher
- Mel (Oscar) Ross, sax
- Carl Greene, horn
- Johnny Morre
- Larry Brown
- Robert Hampson, baritone sax
- 1954: Bill Porter, drums
- 1958 Don Farrar, Bass

== See also ==
- List of jazz arrangers
- Territory bands
