= Herbie Phillips =

American jazz trumpeter, composer and arranger (1935–1995)

- 1964 Photo by trumpeter Kenny Bright

Background information
- Born: Herbert Daly Phillips; April 20, 1935; Lincoln, Nebraska, U.S.
- Died: September 13, 1995 (aged 60) Las Vegas, Nevada
- Genres: Jazz, swing
- Occupations: Composer, arranger
- Instrument: Trumpet

Herbert Daly Phillips, known professionally as Herbie Phillips (April 20, 1935 – September 13, 1995), was an American jazz trumpeter, composer, and arranger. He spent much of his life working in Las Vegas. He played trumpet in bands led by Louie Bellson, Buddy Morrow, and Billy May. He composed "Little Train", which was recorded by the Buddy Rich Big Band. He worked as trumpeter and conductor for Frank Sinatra and Frank Sinatra Jr.

== Early years ==
When he was fourteen, his mother died. She played a significant role in introducing him to music. Distraught over the loss and in conflict with his father, he moved in with his aunt and uncle. When he was nineteen, his father died.

== Career ==
Phillips graduated from Fremont High School in Fremont, Nebraska, in 1953 and attended the University of Nebraska, Lincoln, during the summer of 1954. After high school, he played trumpet in the Dick Mango Orchestra and the Verne Byers Orchestra. While touring with the latter, he met Pat Thompson, a trombonist with whom he became lifelong friends. While touring with Byers, he arranged songs, including "Pennies from Heaven".

In 1955, Phillips and Thompson moved to New York City and shared an apartment. Bill Evans lived in the basement apartment. While waiting to get his union card, a six-month period, Phillips substituted in the bands of Les Elgart, Woody Herman, Dan Terry, Leon Merian, and Jimmy Dorsey. In 1960, he and his wife Carol moved to Las Vegas, joining Thompson. He spent the rest of his life in Las Vegas. He played in several show bands and worked for many years in the house band at the Flamingo Las Vegas.

He belonged to the Las Vegas Hilton house band from 1970 to 1983. Although his colleagues often saw him writing arrangements during breaks, as seen in the documentary film of Elvis Presley's first appearance at the Hilton, he usually refused composer work while working there and concentrated on his house band performances. In 1973, he became close friends with James Moody while Moody worked at the Hilton. He also performed with the David Rose Orchestra.

Several factors compelled Phillips to leave the Hilton. The Hilton management changed the showroom format by bringing in a production show, the type of show that, if it were a hit, would require a musician to play the same music for years. Phillips was disinclined. Around 1975, he injured his lip, which developed into a lump that wouldn't heal. He took lessons to rebuild his embouchure but worried that if he continued to play he would permanently damage his lip.

Verne Byers felt that the music industry (from the perspective of musicians) fell apart in Las Vegas in 1983. According to Byers, the big band era was in decline and casinos were switching from live bands to recorded music, which resulted in a musicians' strike in 1989.

== Personal life ==
Phillips died on September 13, 1995, from complications of an aneurysm while conducting a jazz band rehearsal at the Community College of Southern Nevada.

He was married to (and divorced from) Carol Phillips. He but spent his final 20 years with his girlfriend, Barbara Camp Russo, who discovered that she had known Carol Phillips from their days as chorus line dancers in Las Vegas. Distribution under Phillip's estate went to Russo.

Carl Saunders, trumpeter, band leader, composer, and arranger, became one of Phillip's best friends. Phillips became a mentor to Saunders, who continued to publish and perform Phillips's music. Saunders's album Be Bop Big Band was dedicated to Phillips and includes several of his compositions.

== Discography ==
=== As sideman ===
With Buddy Childers

- Back to Balboa, Vol. 6 (MAMA, 1991)
- Space Race (Discovery, 1992)

With Buddy Morrow

- Dancing Tonight to Morrow (RCA, 1959) (Canada release)
- Big Band Guitar (RCA, 1964)
- Time After Time (Hindsight, 1992)

With Buddy Rich

- Swingin' New Big Band, (Pacific Jazz, 1966)
- The New One! (Pacific Jazz, 1967)
- Time Being (Bluebird, 1971)
- Rich in London (RCA Victor, 1971)
- A Different Drummer (RCA Victor, 1971)
- Very Alive at Ronnie Scott's (1972)

== Posthumous releases ==
- Burning for Buddy, Volume 1, Neil Peart and the Buddy Rich Big Band (Atlantic, 1994) (DVD)
- Wham! Live, Buddy Rich (Label M/Hyena, 2001)
- Live in '78, Buddy Rich (Jazz Icons, 2005) (DVD)

== Compositions and arrangements ==
- "Pennies from Heaven," Johnston & Burke; arr. Phillips
- "Strike out the Band" – Phillips & Saunders
- "Some Bones of Contention" – Phillips & Saunders
- "Compilation" (brisk "I Got Rhythm" contrafact) – Phillips & Saunders
- "Perceptive Hindsight" – Phillips & Saunders
- "Dearly Befuddled" – Phillips & Saunders
- "An Apple for Christa" – Phillips & Saunders
- "Little Train" – Phillips
- "Milestones" – Davis; arr. Phillips
- "My Foolish Heart" – Victor Young & Ned Washington; arr. Phillips
- "Waltz On" – Herbie Phillips
- "My Romance" – Richard Rodgers & Lorenz Hart; arr. Phillips
- "The Girl From Ipanema" – Antonio Carlos Jobim, Vinicius de Moraes, Norman Gimbel; arr. Phillips
- "Night and Day" – Cole Porter; arr. Phillips
- "I'm All for You" (a Latin version of "Body and Soul") – Edward Heyman, Robert Sour, Frank Eyton. Johnny Green; arr. Phillips
- "Cayucus" – Phillips
- "Chet" – Phillips
- "Fridays" – Phillips
- "Round Midnight" – Thelonious Monk; arr. Phillips

== Copyrighted works ==
- The Herb Phillips Songbook, 1990
