= Verne Byers =

American musician (1918–2008)

Vincent LeRoy Beyer (March 14, 1918, Denver, Colorado – December 19, 2008 in Las Cruces, New Mexico), known professionally as Verne Byers or Vern Byers, was an American jazz bandleader, double bass player, promoter, and nightclub owner. He brought The Beatles to Denver when they performed at Red Rocks Amphitheatre on August 26, 1964.

== Early years ==
Born and raised in Denver, Beyer started playing piano at age nine but switched to double bass in middle school because there was more demand for it. He graduated from South High School, then attended the University of Denver for two years from 1937 to 1939. His transcripts under the name "Vernon LeRoy Beyer" show that he was a liberal arts major who enrolled in several journalism classes. At the age of 19, he joined the Denver Musicians' Union. Before graduating from college, he joined the Merchant Marines (around 1939) and was a member of the Navy Concert Band during World War II.

== Career ==
=== Bandleader ===
Verne Byers and His Orchestra played compositions of World War II dance bands, including Glenn Miller, Artie Shaw, and Tommy Dorsey. The band toured the Midwest and Rocky Mountains area in the 1940s and 1950s as one of many territory bands, playing in dance halls, ballrooms and hotels mostly in Colorado, New Mexico, Iowa, and Minnesota. The band often played at Elitch Gardens and once opened for Benny Goodman there. The band had twelve players. During the 1950s, bookings for the band were handled by the Omaha office of National Orchestra Service.

At Danceland and at the Pagosa Springs Lions Club, the band was billed as "Verne Byers and His CBS Orchestra – The Most Danceable Band in the Land." Byers worked with Ted Fio Rito for a year and then toured with Herb Miller, Glenn's brother. He also played with Tommy Tucker, Teddy Powell, and Jan Garber.

=== Concert promoter ===
Byers produced a Beatles concert at the Red Rocks Amphitheatre on August 26, 1964 — a 32-minute affair that was the group's only Denver appearance. As head of Lookout Mountain Attractions, Byers said he had never heard of the Beatles before booking them. He also booked and promoted concerts by Peter, Paul & Mary, Otis Redding, Count Basie, James Brown, and Glen Campbell.

=== Nightclub owner ===
His father and a business partner purchased The Rainbow Ballroom which Byers took over booking in 1947. He continued the policy of booking territory bands and name bands. Byers owned Club Baja from 1960 to 1969. He operated the Thunderbird, a jazz dinner club on Lookout Mountain. He and a partner owned and operated the jazz club The Robin's Nest from 1957 to 1977. Kenny Burrell played there in 1972; Stanley Turrentine in 1973. Other performers included Sarah Vaughan, Stan Getz, Hank Crawford, McCoy Tyner, Herbie Mann, and Dave and Don Grusin.

Byers and his wife, Jeanne, moved to Las Vegas in 1983. In Las Vegas, he hired high quality musicians willing to travel with his territory band. The swing band era was at a low, and major casinos were switching from live bands to taped music, which resulted in a musicians' strike. Interest in swing bands was waning. When traveling for territory bands waned, his band played regularly in Las Vegas until his retirement.

== Final years ==
Byers retired in 2002 and moved to Columbus, New Mexico. He died in Las Cruces, New Mexico, on December 19, 2008, at the age of 90. At the time of his death, he had been married to Jeanne Byers for 58 years.

== Bands and personnel ==
- Verne Byers and His Bermuda Brass (1938)
- Verne Byers and His Bermuda Brass (1972)
- Verne Byers' Glenn Miller Revival (1980s)
- Verne Byers and His Orchestra
