= Terrace Ballroom =

Coordinates: 40.7595°N 111.8925°W

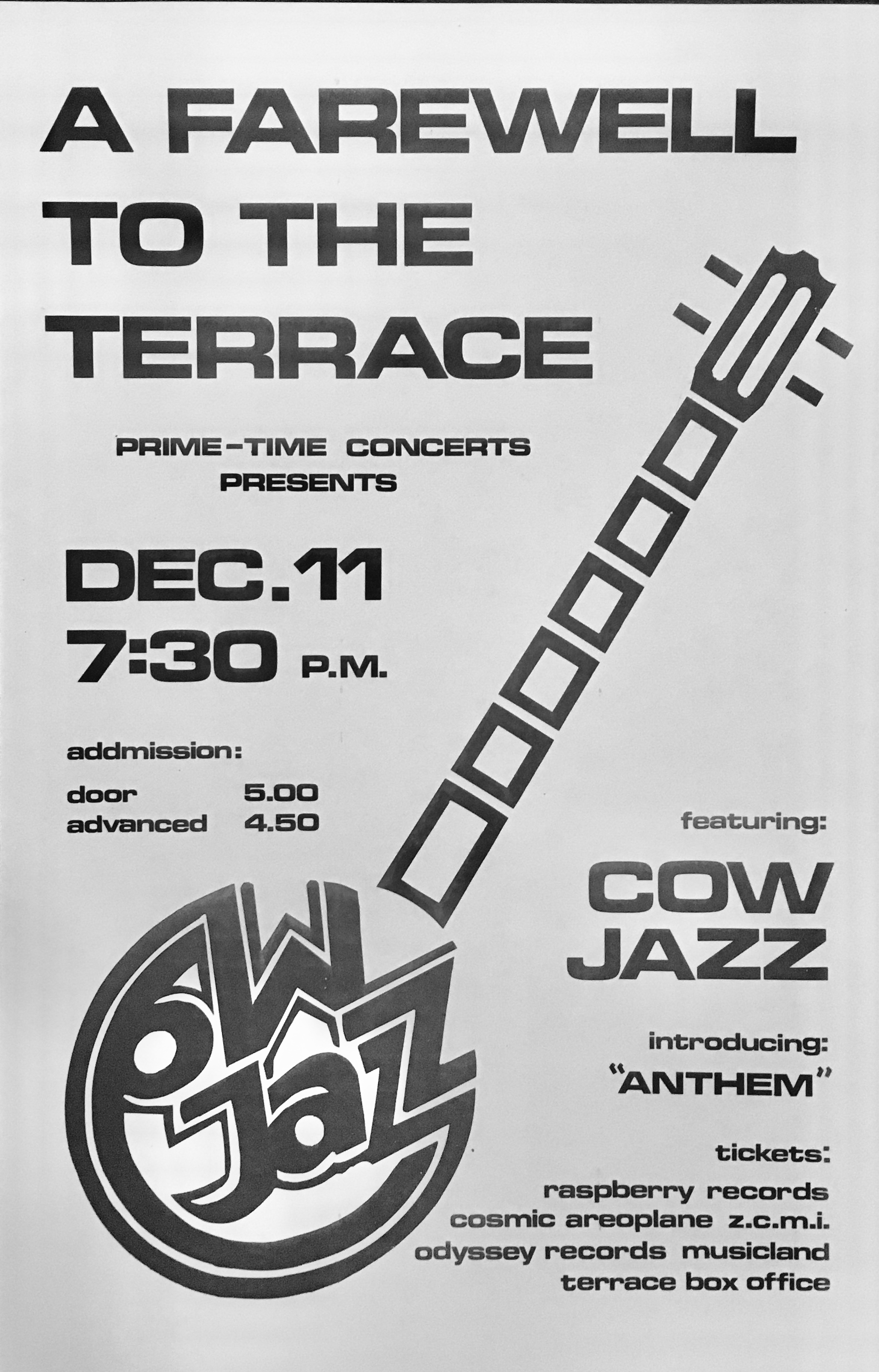
Terrace Ballroom Promotional Poster

The Terrace Ballroom was a ballroom, located on 464 South Main Street, in Salt Lake City, Utah. During the 1930s, when it was called "Coconut Grove", there was no larger ballroom in the United States. Its name was changed in the 1940s to "Rainbow Randevu". The operators of Lagoon Amusement Park began leasing the venue in 1958 and changed the name to Danceland. The name was changed again to The Terrace Ballroom a year later. A policy was in place excluding blacks, but Robert E. Freed opened the ballroom to all people as he did with Lagoon.

The ballroom has hosted concerts by many famous artists, including Kansas, Frank Zappa, Grateful Dead, Wishbone Ash, The Moody Blues, Pink Floyd, Led Zeppelin, Kiss, The Police, Alice Cooper, Janis Joplin, Rush, Jefferson Airplane, and The Doors, among others. In addition, weekly dances were held with a live orchestra every Tuesday night until it closed.

Lagoon Corporation's lease of The Terrace was up in 1978 and the owner, Little America Company had plans to replace it with a new high-rise or a parking lot. A concert was held on December 11, 1978 and featured Claudia Appling singing folk and opening the concert with Yellow Taxi, Cow Jazz Utah band known for country-rock, and Anthem, an upcoming rock-metal band. It was promoted by Raymond Cannefax as a token of respect to a venue he felt was one of America's best concert halls, in line with San Francisco's Winterland. Claudia Appling sang Joni Mitchell's Big Yellow Taxi with its apropos chorus, "They paved Paradise and put up a parking lot." Claudia, a performing and recording artist, became known in the mid-1970's and still known in 2023, as Montana Rose. Claudia resides in Montana. Cannefax left the music promotion business and became a successful entrepreneur in the telecommunications industry and founded Salt Lake City's Apollo Telecom which was absorbed by Japanese business magnate, Hideo Gotto and NTT, Japan's AT&T. After the Farewell to the Terrace concert, Little America reconsidered their plans and extended the lease for three more years and hosted bands such as Journey, Steppenwolf, Hank Williams, Jr., The Police and Frank Zappa.

The final concert held at the Terrace Ballroom was The David LaFlamme Band, who played there on December 26, 1981. LaFlamme (born Gary Posie) was a former member of the San Francisco band It's a Beautiful Day, known for its signature song "White Bird". One more dance was held on New Year's Eve 1981 and The Terrace closed for good. After a fire in 1987, the building was demolished and the lyrics of Claudia Applings song, Joni Mitchell's Yellow Taxi, "They tore down Paradise and put up a Parking Lot," holds true through the present, 2023. The site through August 2023 remains a parking lot. The "A FAREWELL TO THE TERRACE" poster was created in 1978 by Salt Lake City architect, Peter Emmerson.
