= South High School (Denver, Colorado) =

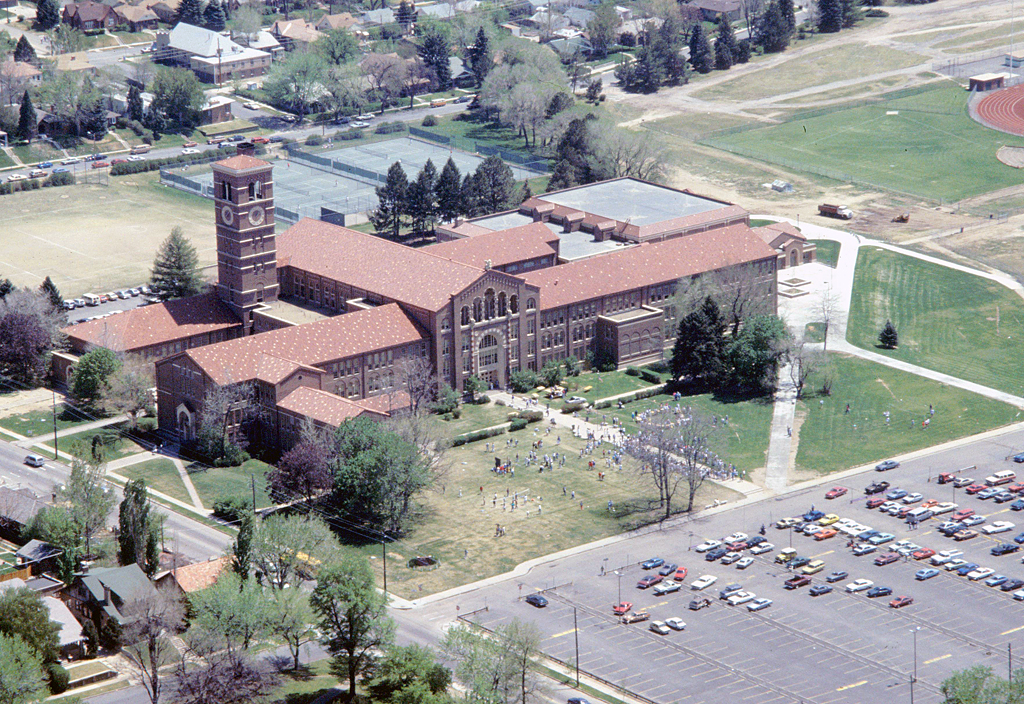

Location
- 1700 East Louisiana Avenue; Denver, Colorado 80210; United States; 39°41′32″N 104°57′57″W

Information
- Type: Public
- Established: 1893 (133 years ago)
- School district: Denver Public Schools
- CEEB code: 060455
- Principal: Rachel Goss
- Teaching staff: 98.51 (FTE)
- Grades: 9–12
- Enrollment: 1,846 (2023–2024)
- Student to teacher ratio: 18.74
- Colors: Purple and white
- Athletics: 4A
- Athletics conference: Denver Prep (Metro 2 for football)
- Mascot: Ravens
- Newspaper: The Gargoyle
- Website: denversouth.dpsk12.org

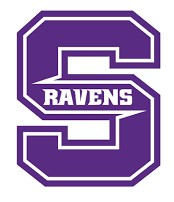
Updated South logo following name change

South High School is a historical public high school in the Washington Park neighborhood on the south side of Denver, Colorado, United States. It is part of Denver Public Schools, and is one of four original high schools in Denver. The other three are East, North, and West.

== History ==
In 1893, high school classes were established in two rooms of the Grant school (now Grant Middle School). By 1907, an addition was required because of overcrowding. In January 1925, there were 800 students in the senior high school section and more space was desperately needed. A bond issue was voted into effect in October 1925, and funds for a new school were raised. The cost of construction was $1,252,000 ($22,985,009 in 2025 dollars) and the building was intended to last a century. Denver South officially separated from Grant in fall 1926.

South High School was one of 16 schools nationwide selected by the College Board for inclusion in the EXCELerator School Improvement Model program, beginning in the 2007–2008 school year. The project was funded by the Bill & Melinda Gates Foundation.

== Campus ==
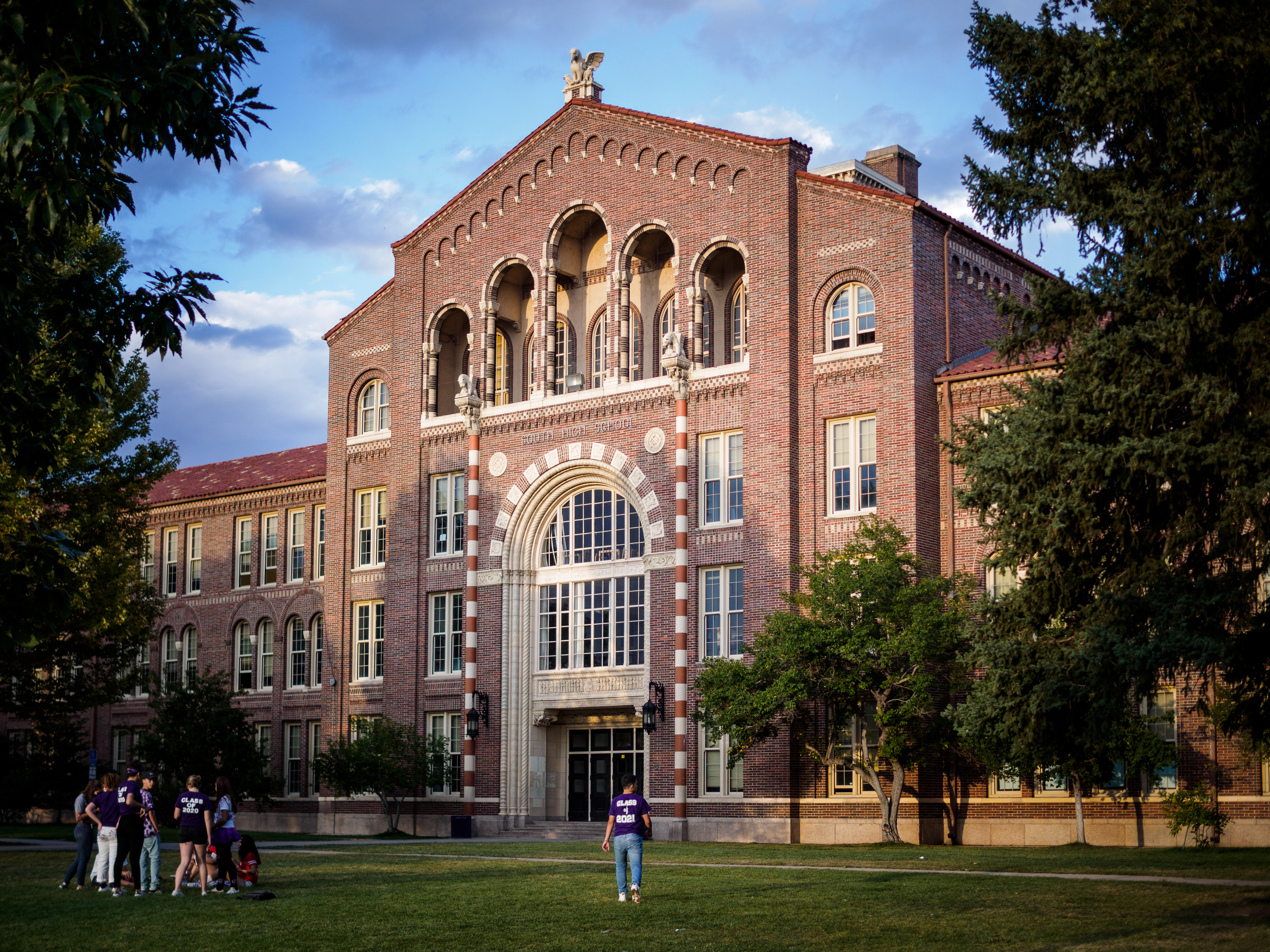
Front facade of South High School

South High School was designed by the architectural firm of Fisher & Fisher in the time's popular Romanesque style. Sculptor Robert Garrison created many of the building's adornments, including the 3 foot (1 meter) tall gargoyle above the building's main entrance; this symbolic protector of South was inspired by a gargoyle at the Italian Cathedral of Spoleto. On either side of the main entrance, bas-relief figures of teachers hold in their hands creatures representing examinations who are attempting to devour students. On the door are friezes of Faculty Row (a scene resembling the Last Supper, with the principal in the center) and Animal Spirits (frolicking student-like creatures).

Although there are some differences, South's Clock Tower is thought to be a replica of the one at Santa Maria in Cosmedin. After the tower's original roof deck began to leak, a State Historical Fund grant was secured to replace the roof and update the electrical work.

Many of the changes to the building have been to subdivide former study halls and repurpose other rooms into usable classroom space. The boys' gym, or North Gym, had a balcony allowing for spectator basketball games, which was removed in the late 1950s and early 1960s with the addition of the auxiliary gym, the girls' locker rooms and the new JROTC offices. In 1964 the southwest wing was added, followed in 1989 by a new gymnasium. This completed an expansion planned before World War II but never realized because of the rationing and shortages due to the war.

The building was listed on the National Register of Historic Places in 2022.

== Students and academics ==
The school makes it easy for students to plan for college by offering a college summit course, and a "Future Center", sponsored by the Denver Scholarship Foundation. The Future Center provides students help with anything regarding colleges, such as applications, and how to get financial aid.

South is the first battalion in the Denver Public Schools JROTC program.

== Demographics ==
As of the 2020–2021 school year, South High School has a total enrollment of 1,715 students in grades nine through twelve.

- White: 45.6%
- Hispanic/Latino: 31.5%
- African American/Black: 11.8%
- Asian & Pacific Islander: 5.7%
- Multiple Races: 4.5%
- American Indian: <1%

== Athletics ==
The athletic teams of South High School are known as the Ravens, formerly known as The Rebels. The school competes in multiple athletic divisions - the 4A Metro 2 division for football, and the 5A/4A/3A mixed Denver Prep division (comprising mostly DPS teams) for other sports. As of 2021, the athletic director is Adam Kelsey. South's athletic programs have produced multiple professional athletes, including NFL players Phillip Lindsay and Calais Campbell. They also have teams like cheerleading, cross country, golf, gymnastics, soccer, softball, tennis, volleyball, basketball, swim and dive, wrestling, lacrosse, and track and field.

== Alumni association ==
South High School has one of the most active alumni association of all the public high schools in Denver. South High Alumni and Friends, Inc. (SHAFI) has office and museum space in the basement of the high school, in what was once a classroom and the gun range for the JROTC program. In recent years the alumni association has been responsible for the restoration of the clock tower and new flagpole.

Among its activities, SHAFI maintains a database of all graduates of South High School, is building a database of faculty and staff of the school, publishes a newsletter several times a year for its members, and maintains a school museum. Due to its prominence as a South Denver landmark the museum has also become the repository for history, artifacts and memorabilia pertaining to Washington Park and the surrounding neighborhood. It also stores the memorabilia of the middle school and elementary schools that feed into the high school.

== Controversy ==
When Denver Public Schools named its four cardinal direction high schools (East, West, North and South), each took a mascot and imagery associated with that direction. For example, West High School took the Cowboy as its mascot.

South High School took imagery from the Civil War, specifically from the Confederate States of America. This included taking the "Johnny Reb" head as its mascot, and using the Confederate Battle Flag and the song "Dixie". The use of the flag and song ended in 1970 when Denver Public Schools implemented desegregation busing as a means of racial integration. The imagery was incorporated into the name of the yearbook, The Johnny Reb, (changing it from The Tower Book) and school newspaper, The Confederate.

These images and mascot began to cause controversy in 1970. By 1980, South's first African American principal, Harold Scott, suggested that the mascot be changed to the Penguin. He did not anticipate the attachment the student body had to the name "Rebel", nor the furor that ensued, and the suggestion was dropped.

During the 2007–2008 school year the student body began to discuss changing the mascot. They eventually decided on a gargoyle with the school's famous clock tower in the background. On February 19, 2009, the students made a presentation to the Denver Public School board asking for the change, which was granted. In a compromise with school alumni, the name "Rebel" was kept.

On October 23, 2020, South High School officially announced that they would be changing their mascot to the Raven, becoming the South High Ravens.

The South High School mascot controversy, and subsequent change, was chronicled in an episode titled "Denver South", released on October 15, 2024, of Rebel Spirit with Akilah Hughes, a podcast where Akilah Hughes returns to Boone County High School in Florence, Kentucky, where she graduated, and attempts to convince the school to likewise change its confederate general mascot. The episode features interviews with some of those involved in changing South High School's mascot, including Bobby Thomas, who was principal when the change was made, as well as NFL player and South High School alum Calais Campbell, who supported the change and donated $30,000 toward its cost.

== Notable alumni ==
- Harold Agnew, American Physicist
- Janet Bonnema, first woman allowed to enter a tunnel project in Colorado
- Stan Brakhage, 1951, experimental filmmaker
- Verne Byers, 1937, musician and bandleader (known in high school as Vincent Beyer)
- Calais Campbell, 2004, football player, Baltimore Ravens, Jacksonville Jaguars, Arizona Cardinals
- Conor Casey, soccer player, Philadelphia Union
- Ken Charlton, 1959, All-American basketball player at University of Colorado
- Adrian Cooper, 1986?, former NFL tight end
- Chuck Darling, member of 1956 Summer Olympics basketball gold medalists, First team All-American at University of Iowa
- Diana DeGette, U.S. Representative from Colorado's 1st district
- Patricia Elliott, 1956, actress and TV personality
- John L. Hall, 1952, Nobel laureate (Physics)
- Marilyn Hickey, evangelist
- Robert Higgins, 1950, zoologist, professor, scholar, marine life researcher, curator at Smithsonian Institution
- Michael Lavine, 1981, photographer
- Phillip Lindsay, 2013, American football player, Houston Texans, Denver Broncos
- Fred Meissner, world-renowned geoscientist, professor at Colorado School of Mines and author
- Albert Mooney, 1924, founder of Mooney Aircraft Company
- Mike Perez, 1983, pro football player, quarterback at San Jose State
- Bert Stiles, 1938, author and Purple Heart recipient
- James Tenney, 1952, composer and music theorist
- Brett Tuggle, 1970, touring musician and songwriter with Fleetwood Mac and David Lee Roth - died 2022
- Robert M. Warner, 1945, 6th Archivist of the United States, 1980–1985, pushed for National Archives and Records Administration to become own independent federal agency
- LenDale White, football player, USC and Denver Broncos
- Nick Willhite 1959, baseball player pitched from 1963-1967 for Los Angeles Dodgers, Washington Senators, California Angels and New York Mets

== In popular culture ==
The Disney Channel TV series Good Luck Charlie, which was set in Denver, occasionally used exterior shots of the school. Characters in the show attended a fictionalized version of Denver South High School that featured a ram as its mascot and blue and orange as its school colors; a fictionalized version of North High School was the school's rival.
