= Phillip Lindsay =

American football player (born 1994)

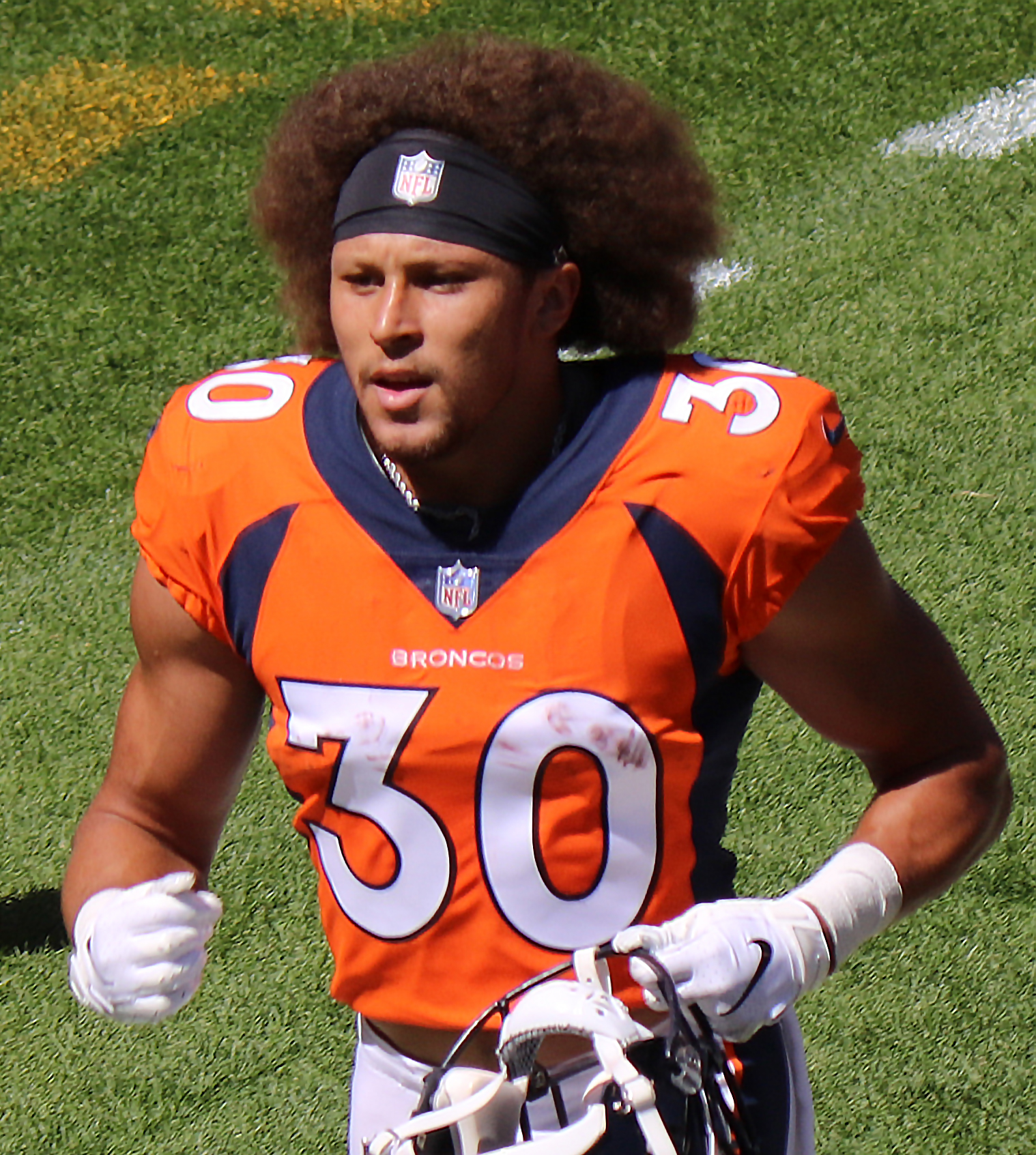
- Lindsay with the Denver Broncos in 2018

No. 30, 31
- Position: Running back

Personal information
- Born: July 24, 1994 (age 32); Denver, Colorado, U.S.
- Listed height: 5 ft 8 in (1.73 m)
- Listed weight: 190 lb (86 kg)

Career information
- High school: South (Denver)
- College: Colorado (2013–2017)
- NFL draft: 2018: undrafted

Career history
- Denver Broncos (2018–2020); Houston Texans (2021); Miami Dolphins (2021); Indianapolis Colts (2022); Seattle Sea Dragons (2023)

Awards and highlights
- Pro Bowl (2018); PFWA All-Rookie Team (2018); Second-team All-Pac-12 (2016)

Career NFL statistics
- Rushing yards: 2,848
- Rushing average: 4.5
- Rushing touchdowns: 18
- Receptions: 87
- Receiving yards: 529
- Receiving touchdowns: 2
- Stats at Pro Football Reference

Phillip Lindsay (born July 24, 1994) is an American former professional football player who was a running back in the National Football League (NFL). He was born in Denver, Colorado, grew up in Aurora, Colorado, and attended South High School in Denver where he became the school's all-time leading rusher with 4,587 yards. He played college football for the Colorado Buffaloes and set the school record in all-purpose yards (5,760) and yards from scrimmage (4,683). He was signed as an undrafted free agent by the Denver Broncos in 2018. Lindsay became the first undrafted offensive rookie to make the Pro Bowl. He is the only NFL player since 1950 to record 700 or more career touches without a fumble.

== Early life ==
Lindsay, like his father Troy, played running back in high school. At South High School, Lindsay elected to wear the same jersey number as his father, 22. Playing for the Rebels, he chased the Denver Public School District record for rushing yards (4,400), which was set by his father in 1979. After a successful first three years of high school, Lindsay committed to playing for the University of Colorado Boulder. Shortly after surpassing his father's rushing record during his senior season, Lindsay suffered a severe ACL tear that brought an end to his high school career. Despite this injury, Mike MacIntyre, Colorado's coach, upheld the school's scholarship offer for the 2013 season. Apart from football, Lindsay also lettered in basketball as a freshman, and lettered all four years in track and field, where he ran sprints and relays and had personal bests of 10.9 seconds in the 100-meter dash, 22.2 in the 200 and 49.0 in the 400.

== College career ==
Lindsay joined the Colorado team during the fall of 2013. He opted to redshirt during the 2013 season, during which time his work on the scout team earned him the honor of "Offensive Scout Team Player of the Year."

Before the 2014 season began, head coach Mike MacIntyre began calling Lindsay the "Tasmanian Devil" due to his quickness and determination on the field. As a backup running back and kick returner back during the season, Lindsay played in all 12 of the school's games. He led the team in kick returns and return yards and finished fourth on the team overall in rushing yards. Lindsay averaged 4.9 yards per carry in his 79 carries of the season.

Like the 2014 season, Lindsay saw action in all of the Buffaloes' games in 2015. He led the team in rushing attempts (140) and rushing yards (643), averaging 4.7 yards per carry. Lindsay scored seven touchdowns during the season, six rushing and one receiving. Despite only being a sophomore, Lindsay was elected by his teammates and coaches to be a team captain.

During the 2016 season, he rushed for 1,252 yards on 244 carries for an average of 5.1 yards per carry.

During his senior season in 2017, he rushed for a career-high 281 yards against Arizona. During the 2017 regular season, he ranked ninth among all Football Bowl Subdivision players with 1,474 rushing yards. Lindsay finished the 2017 season with the most rushing attempts (301) in Division I play. He was selected as a semifinalist for the Doak Walker Award for the nation's top running back.

Lindsay set the Colorado career record for all-purpose yards and yards from scrimmage and ranked second in school history in rushing yardage and fifth in points scored.

== Professional career ==
Pre-draft measurables
| Height | Weight | Arm length | Hand span | 40-yard dash | 10-yard split | 20-yard split | 20-yard shuttle | Three-cone drill | Vertical jump | Broad jump | Bench press |
|---|---|---|---|---|---|---|---|---|---|---|---|
| 5 ft 7 1/4 in (1.71 m) | 184 lb (83 kg) | 30 7/8 in (0.78 m) | 8 5/8 in (0.22 m) | 4.39 s | 1.57 s | 2.60 s | 4.31 s | 7.12 s | 35 1/2 in (0.90 m) | 10 ft 4 in (3.15 m) | 14 reps |
All values from Pro Day

=== Denver Broncos ===
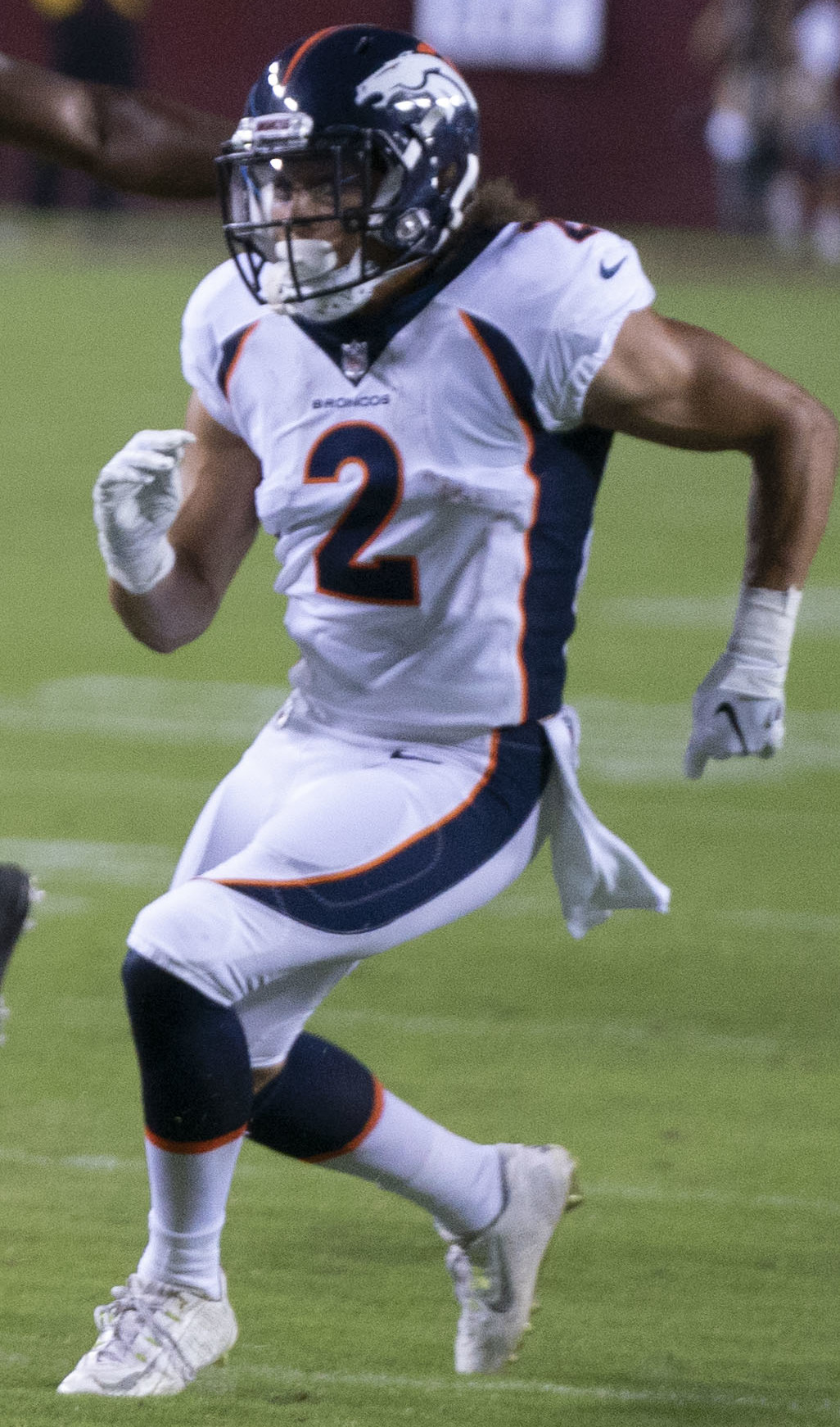
Lindsay in the 2018 preseason

==== 2018 ====
Lindsay signed with the Denver Broncos as an undrafted free agent on May 1, 2018. He made the Broncos' final roster after an impressive preseason, and was named the No. 3 running back on the depth chart behind third-round rookie Royce Freeman and veteran Devontae Booker. In Week 1, against the Seattle Seahawks, he rushed for 71 yards on 15 carries and recorded two receptions for 31 yards and a receiving touchdown. The following week, in a 20–19 victory over the Oakland Raiders, Lindsay ran for 107 yards and had one reception for four yards. He became the first undrafted player in NFL history with 100+ scrimmage yards in each of their first two games. During Week 3 against the Baltimore Ravens, Lindsay was ejected for throwing punches after a fumble. He was held to 20 rushing yards as the Broncos lost 14–27. In Week 4, against the Kansas City Chiefs, Lindsay had 69 rushing yards and added another rushing touchdown. In Week 11, in a 23–22 victory over the Los Angeles Chargers, Lindsay recorded his first multi-rushing touchdown game. In a Week 12 victory over the Pittsburgh Steelers, he had a season-high 110 rushing yards and a rushing touchdown. In a Week 13 game against the Cincinnati Bengals, he rushed for a career-high 157 yards and two touchdowns, earning him the American Football Conference Offensive Player of the Week award. On December 18, 2018, Lindsay was voted to his first Pro Bowl making him the first undrafted offensive rookie in NFL history to be voted to a Pro Bowl. On December 24, 2018, Lindsay, who injured his wrist against the Raiders, was placed on injured reserve ahead of the Broncos' final season game. He finished his first season with 1,278 total yards (1,037 rushing yards, 241 receiving yards) from scrimmage and 10 touchdowns while splitting carries almost evenly with Royce Freeman. He was named to the Pro Football Writers of America All-Rookie Team, becoming the fourth Broncos running back to receive this award, joining Bobby Humphrey (1989), Terrell Davis (1995), and Olandis Gary (1999). He was ranked 68th by his fellow players on the NFL Top 100 Players of 2019.

==== 2019 ====
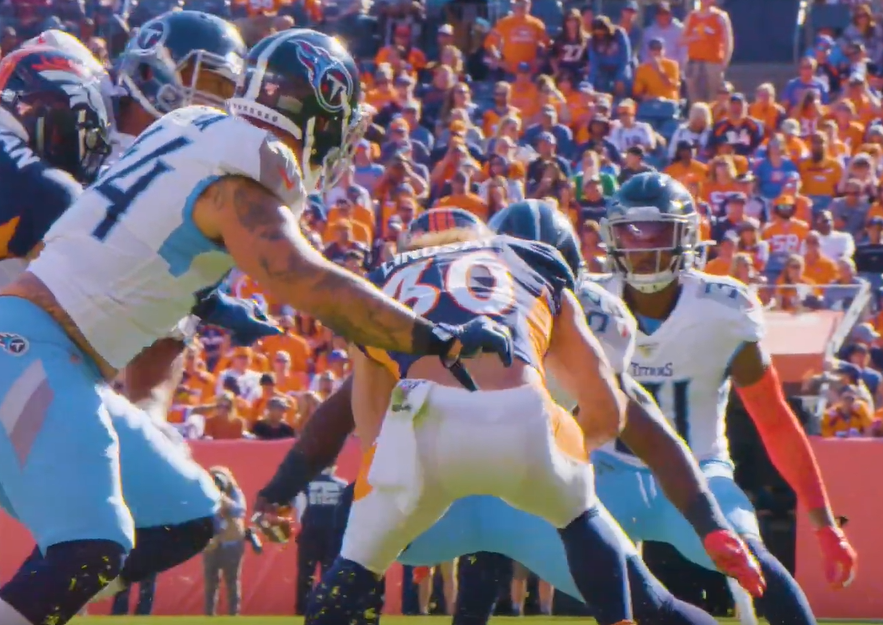
Lindsay in a game against the Tennessee Titans

Lindsay made his return from injury in Week 1 against the Raiders. In the game, Lindsay rushed 11 times for 43 yards and caught four passes for 23 yards in the 24–16 loss. In Week 3 against the Green Bay Packers, Lindsay rushed 21 times for 81 yards and two touchdowns and caught four passes for 49 yards as the Broncos lost 27–16. In Week 5 against the Chargers, Lindsay rushed 15 times for 114 yards and one touchdown and caught four passes for 33 yards as the Broncos won their first game of the season by a score of 20–13. In Week 16 against the Detroit Lions, Lindsay rushed 19 times for 109 yards and a touchdown during the 27–17 win. In the season finale against the Raiders, Lindsay surpassed 1,000 yards rushing to become the first undrafted player in league history to do so in his first two seasons.

==== 2020 ====
In Week 1 against the Tennessee Titans, Lindsay rushed for 24 yards before exiting the game with a toe injury. Without Lindsay, the Broncos lost the game 16–14. Lindsay made his return from injury in Week 6 against the New England Patriots. During the game, Lindsay rushed for 101 yards during the 18–12 win. In Week 8 against the Chargers, Lindsay rushed 6 times for 83 yards (13.8 yards per carry) and his first rushing touchdown of the season during the 31–30 win. On December 26, 2020, Lindsay was placed on injured reserve. He finished the season with 118 carries for 502 rushing yards and one rushing touchdown.

The Broncos placed a right of first refusal (RFR) restricted free agent tender on Lindsay on March 16, 2021. However, on March 18, the Broncos rescinded the tender on Lindsay, making him a free agent. As of the 2025 NFL season, Lindsay is the last Broncos running back to rush for 1000+ yards in a single season.

=== Houston Texans ===
Lindsay signed with the Houston Texans on March 30, 2021. He entered the 2021 season as the third running back on the depth chart behind Mark Ingram II and David Johnson. He played in 10 games before being released on November 23, 2021.

=== Miami Dolphins ===
The Miami Dolphins claimed Lindsay off waivers on November 24, 2021. He finished the 2021 season with 88 carries for 249 rushing yards and one rushing touchdown to go along with four receptions for 45 receiving yards and one receiving touchdown.

=== Indianapolis Colts ===
On May 18, 2022, Lindsay signed with the Indianapolis Colts. He was released on August 30, 2022, but signed to the practice squad a week later. He was elevated to the active roster on October 6 for the Colts' Week 5 game against the Broncos due to an injury to starting running back Jonathan Taylor. On October 15, Lindsay was elevated to the active roster. Lindsay was released from the active roster and re-signed to the practice squad on November 7. He was then released from the Colts' practice squad on November 10, to make room for Jake Funk.

=== Seattle Sea Dragons ===
On April 1, 2023, Lindsay signed with the Seattle Sea Dragons of the XFL. Lindsay made his XFL debut on April 9, 2023, where he scored a two-yard rushing touchdown. The Sea Dragons folded when the XFL and United States Football League merged to create the United Football League (UFL).

== Career statistics ==
=== NFL ===
| Year | Team | Games | | Rushing | | | | | Receiving | | | | | Fumbles | |
| Year | Team | GP | GS | Att | Yds | Avg | Lng | TD | Rec | Yds | Avg | Lng | TD | Fum | Lost |
|---|---|---|---|---|---|---|---|---|---|---|---|---|---|---|---|
| 2018 | DEN | 15 | 8 | 192 | 1,037 | 5.4 | 65T | 9 | 35 | 241 | 6.9 | 29T | 1 | 0 | 0 |
| 2019 | DEN | 16 | 16 | 224 | 1,011 | 4.5 | 40 | 7 | 35 | 196 | 5.6 | 36 | 0 | 0 | 0 |
| 2020 | DEN | 11 | 8 | 118 | 502 | 4.3 | 55 | 1 | 7 | 28 | 4.0 | 11 | 0 | 0 | 0 |
| 2021 | HOU | 10 | 1 | 50 | 130 | 2.6 | 35T | 1 | 3 | 37 | 12.3 | 22 | 1 | 0 | 0 |
| 2021 | MIA | 4 | 0 | 38 | 119 | 3.1 | 9 | 0 | 1 | 8 | 8.0 | 8 | 0 | 0 | 0 |
| 2022 | IND | 3 | 0 | 15 | 49 | 3.3 | 15 | 0 | 6 | 19 | 3.2 | 7 | 0 | 0 | 0 |
| Career | | 59 | 43 | 637 | 2,848 | 4.5 | 65T | 18 | 87 | 529 | 6.1 | 36 | 2 | 0 | 0 |

=== XFL ===
Regular season

| Year | Team | Games | | Rushing | | | | | Receiving | | | | | Fumbles | |
| Year | Team | GP | GS | Att | Yds | Avg | Lng | TD | Rec | Yds | Avg | Lng | TD | Fum | Lost |
|---|---|---|---|---|---|---|---|---|---|---|---|---|---|---|---|
| 2023 | SEA | 3 | 2 | 24 | 70 | 2.9 | 11 | 1 | 3 | 8 | 2.7 | 8 | 0 | 0 | 0 |
| Career | | 1 | 1 | 8 | 23 | 2.9 | 8 | 1 | 3 | 8 | 2.7 | 8 | 0 | 0 | 0 |

Postseason

| Year | Team | Games | | Rushing | | | | | Receiving | | | | | Fumbles | |
| Year | Team | GP | GS | Att | Yds | Avg | Lng | TD | Rec | Yds | Avg | Lng | TD | Fum | Lost |
|---|---|---|---|---|---|---|---|---|---|---|---|---|---|---|---|
| 2023 | SEA | 1 | 0 | 2 | -3 | -1.5 | 0 | 0 | 0 | – | – | – | – | 0 | – |
| Career | | 1 | 0 | 2 | -3 | -1.5 | 0 | 0 | 0 | 0 | 0.0 | 0 | 0 | 0 | 0 |

=== College ===
| Season | Team | Rushing | | | | | Receiving | | | | | Kick return | | | |
| Season | Team | Att | Yds | Avg | Lng | TD | Rec | Yds | Avg | Lng | TD | Att | Yds | Avg | TD |
|---|---|---|---|---|---|---|---|---|---|---|---|---|---|---|---|
| 2013 | Colorado | Redshirt | | | | | | | | | | | | | |
| 2014 | Colorado | 79 | 391 | 4.9 | 36 | 0 | 14 | 118 | 8.4 | 27 | 0 | 36 | 849 | 23.6 | 0 |
| 2015 | Colorado | 140 | 653 | 4.7 | 37 | 6 | 26 | 211 | 8.1 | 34 | 1 | 7 | 154 | 22.0 | 0 |
| 2016 | Colorado | 244 | 1,252 | 5.1 | 75 | 16 | 53 | 493 | 9.3 | 67 | 1 | 2 | 74 | 37.0 | 0 |
| 2017 | Colorado | 301 | 1,474 | 4.9 | 74 | 14 | 23 | 257 | 11.2 | 60 | 1 | 0 | 0 | 0.0 | 0 |
| Total | | 764 | 3,770 | 4.9 | 75 | 36 | 116 | 1,079 | 9.2 | 67 | 3 | 45 | 1,077 | 23.9 | 0 |
