= Wilson Trailer Company =

American cargo trailer manufacturer

- Wilson Trailer Company (logo ↑) Since 1890 ... A Good Name to Have Behind You!™ (slogan)
- Industry: Sector: industrials; Industry: industrial products; Sub-industry: transportation equipment
- Founded: 1883; 143 years ago in the Huron territory, South Dakota
- Founders: Frank Taplin Wilson & George Washington Wilson (brothers)
- Headquarters: 4400 South Lewis Blvd; Sioux City, Iowa 51106
- Number of locations: Headquarters, 4 production facilities, 1 service center
- Products: Livestock trailers; commodity (grain) trailers; flatbed trailers; gooseneck livestock trailers; self unloading belt conveyors
- Number of employees: 501–1000 (2021)
- Website: www.wilsontrailer.com

Wilson Trailer Company is an Iowa corporation, independent (privately held) cargo trailer manufacturer headquartered in Sioux City. Wilson manufactures (i) industrial road transport trailers for livestock, grain, and the like – flatbed and gooseneck design, aluminum and custom – and (ii) trailer-equipment and accessories such as self-unloading belt conveyors.

== History ==
Frank Taplin Wilson founded the company in 1883 as a small wagon and carriage shop in the Huron territory, South Dakota. In 1890, he moved to Sioux City, Iowa, to join his brother, George Washington Wilson (1859–1913). Wilson Trailer is still family operated by the fourth and fifth generations.

Frank Taplin Wilson (1863–1947) & Kate Florence Jenkins (1872–1950) co-founder, et ux.	George Washington Wilson (1859–1913) & Fannie Ann Main (1863–1953) co-founder, et ux.
Mildred Ruth Wilson (1897–1981) & Clarence Arthur Persinger (1895–1959) daughter, et ux.
Clarence Wilson Persinger (1923–2010) & Louise Elizabeth Gunderson (1925–2018) grandson, et ux.
Wilson Gunderson (Bill) Persinger (born 1949) & Lynn Humphries great-grandson, co-CEO, et ux.	John Thomas Persinger (born 1959) & Connie Jo Rosene great-grandson, co-CEO, et ux.
Tiffany L. Persinger (born 1977) & Christopher M. Hunt (born 1976) great-great-granddaughter, et ux. Vice President Operations, since February 2021

=== Big band history – sleeper buses ===
In the late 1930s, Wilson began manufacturing sleeper buses for big bands, notably territory bands. Lawrence Welk has speculated that he was the first to design and use a sleeper bus.

== Production plants ==
Wilson Trailer has six facilities:

1. Sioux City, Iowa — headquarters
2. Yankton, South Dakota — modern production facility
3. Moberly, Missouri — modern production facility
4. Lennox, South Dakota — modern production facility
5. Sioux City, Iowa — modern production facility
6. Sioux City, Iowa — corporate parts and service center

== Bibliography ==
=== References ===
- Billboard (November 13, 1937). "Low-Price Bands Save Dough By Using Bus, Truck Trailers" (PDF). Vol. 49, no. 46. p. 17 – via americanradiohistory.com; David Frackelton Gleason (born 1946), Cleveland.
- Coakley, Mary Lewis (1907–1995) (1958). Mister Music Maker, Lawrence Welk (1st ed.). Doubleday. p. 151 – via Internet Archive. OCLC 493799 (all editions).
- Davis, Bob (April 17, 1976). "Wilson Trailer Shows Continued Growth Here". Sioux City Journal. Vol. 112, no. 261. Sioux City. p. A15 – via Newspapers.com.
- Shotwell, Bob (March 6, 1988). "He Still Waits for Bus; Not Any Bus; A 'Sleeper' From '30s". Des Moines Register. Vol. 139, no. 37. Des Moines. p. 1F – via Newspapers.com.

=== Primary references ===
- "Wilson Trailer Company Information and History – 1938". Wilson Trailer. Sioux City (see photo of Lawrence Welk's sleeper bus under the 1928 timeline tab).
- "Wilson Trailer Company". LinkedIn.
