= Leroy Smith (activist) =

African American entrepreneur and activist

Leroy Smith (1911–1989) was an African American entrepreneur and activist.

Born in Eufaula, Oklahoma, he later moved to Denver, Colorado where he became well known to the business community. Smith is notable for being Colorado's first African American deputy game warden, the first Black member of Denver's Chamber of Commerce, and first Black outfitter licensed to sell guns. Smith has been inducted into the Broadcast Pioneers of Colorado Hall of Fame as of 2017 for his work as Denver's first African American radio DJ.
