= Dick Mango =

American jazz saxophonist and composer (1912–1975)

Richard J. Mango (15 July 1912 in Pennsylvania – 8 June 1975 in Olmsted County, Minnesota) was an American jazz saxophonist and composer. He attended Vandergrift High School in 1927-28 as a Freshman.

== Selected compositions and arrangements ==
- You're the Answer, William S. Mango (Dick's brother; 1914–2001) & Richard J. Mango © Sept 14, 1944 (41433)

== Former members of the Dick Mango Orchestra ==
- Bob Olsen (né Robert George Olsen; born 1929) — trumpet

-Kenny White Alto Sax 12/18/1934 Grand Junction Colorado - Presently Klamath Falls Oregon
