= Territory band =

Type of dance band in the United States

Territory bands were dance bands that crisscrossed specific regions of the United States from the 1920s through the 1960s. Beginning in the 1920s, the bands typically had 8 to 12 musicians. These bands typically played one-nighters, six or seven nights a week at venues like VFW halls, Elks Lodges, Lions Clubs, hotel ballrooms, and the like. Francis Davis, jazz critic for The Village Voice, likened territory bands to "the Top 40 cover bands (of the 1970s and 1980s) of their day, typically relying on stock arrangements of other ensembles' hits." He said, "many historians give much credit to territory bands for popularizing modern ballroom dancing that began during the World War I era with the influence of Vernon and Irene Castle."

Territory bands helped disseminate popular music—which included swing, jazz, sweet dance music, or any combination thereof—bringing it to remote gin mills and dance halls that were otherwise ignored by national booking agents representing genuine recording stars like Ellington and Armstrong. Many developed original repertoires and signature sounds, none more storied than Walter Page's Blue Devils, the Oklahoma City-based outfit that Count Basie joined in 1926.

== History ==
Territory bands rarely recorded and were often considered secondary in ability. They played in particular states or regions of the country. Ambitious and hopeful young musicians saw territory bands as a stepping stone to the nationally established dance bands and later swung big bands. Audiences that wanted to dance kept the bands employed.

=== Territories ===
Home territories were loosely defined, but some classifications emerged. Generally, the areas were defined as Northeast, Southeast, Midwest, West Coast, Southwest, and Northwest. In addition, some state-groupings became common. MINK comprised Minnesota, Iowa, Nebraska and Kansas. VSA comprised Virginia, South Carolina and Alabama. The Southwest proved especially fertile for territory bands. Texas, with its open geography and relatively large population, offered the greatest opportunity with developed markets for dance music in Austin, Amarillo, Dallas, Fort Worth, Houston, and San Antonio. The homegrown audiences of Texas bands were so plentiful that the bands developed to a high degree in relative isolation from outside influences. One such band was that of Alphonso Trent. Two other important groups out of the Southwest, Kansas City specifically, were Bennie Moten's band and Jay McShann's band. Musicians from the Moten band along with musicians from the Oklahoma City Blue Devils became one of the most influential jazz bands, under the leadership of Count Basie. McShann's band was on par with these groups and was where Charlie Parker began to show signs of true innovation. Bands from Los Angeles and Seattle performed not only in California, Oregon, and Washington, but also in Arizona, Louisiana, Nevada, New Mexico, Texas, Utah, and Wyoming. The Glenn Henry Orchestra, which got its first big break playing summers at Yellowstone Park from 1935 to 1940, became a popular West Coast territory band. There were military territories, too, such as Officers' clubs and Non-commissioned Officer clubs. These clubs took bands to Bermuda, Greenland, Nova Scotia, Puerto Rico, as well as the U.S.

=== Styles ===
Audiences responded with great enthusiasm to the black bands in the Midwest. The East Coast black bands were popular in the 1920s, but hot dance music came to that region in the form of Louis Armstrong joining the Fletcher Henderson band when he went to New York City.

Territory bands were not all swing bands. The Midwest settlements of Europeans of various ethnicities, brought their community dancing and revelry with them, in the form of popular polka bands (and also old time waltzes, ländlers, and schottisches). They played at all the ballrooms and Elk Clubs and included Babe Wagner Band, Fezz Fritsche & His Goose-town Band, Six Fat Dutchmen, and Whoopie John, a polka band from Minneapolis.

=== 1920s swing and ballroom dancing ===
In 1924, according to Variety, there were more than 900 dance bands, representing steady work for 7,200 musicians. There were 68 Whiteman orchestras across the country, playing music from the Whiteman library, eleven in New York alone. In the mid-1920s, bands typically had ten musicians: two altos, one tenor (who often doubled on other woodwinds and sometimes violin), two trumpets, trombone, banjo or guitar, piano, string bass or brass bass, and drums. Sometimes there were two trombones. If the band had only two saxophones, they would be alto and tenor.

=== Great Depression ===
The Great Depression, which hit bottom in 1933, was hard on territory bands. The public strained to afford entertainment. It was not uncommon for bands to be stranded for lack of funds. Many broke up during this period.

=== 1940s decline ===
There are many theories on why swing music and territory bands declined. One of them is that record companies discovered — during the AFM recording bans of 1942-43 and 1948 — that they could profit from record sales, churning out hit parade music with just singers, who were exempt from the recording bans. This marked a period when singers became more popular than bandleaders. ]. The record companies gained control over what got recorded; therefore music that was slated for a new market of teenagers was born. This destroyed several booking agencies. MCA, who broke up as many bands as it booked, moved to Hollywood. Frederic Bros. (Chicago) had a fallout with several of its bands. The Vic Schroeder Agency (Omaha), was one of the more responsible bookers before World War II but, little is known after — same with the White Agency.

=== Female bands ===
In the history of traveling dance bands, all female bands are often excluded, or only given minor inclusion. . All women groups performing American genres of music dates back to minstrel groups like Madame Rentz's Female Minstrels. Because women could not easily enter prestigious music bands that were essentially all male, all women groups continuously popped up as groups that allowed skilled female musicians to perform. Sometimes they were put together with help from outside sources. It was not uncommon for a group to be put together by a man or a talent agency, but to consist of all female performers. Sometimes performers received aide from family or friends involved in the business to help get their foot in the door. For instance, Lil Hardin Armstrong had an all woman dance band in the early 1930s. This group went by such names as "Lil Armstrong and Her Swing Band." Other bands popular in the 1930s include The Harlem Playgirls, The Dixie Sweethearts, the Darlings of Rhythm, and Gertrude Long and Her Rambling Night Hawks.

Even banding together with other women though, public perception would sometimes view all female bands as "all-girl gimmicks." Some talented musicians avoided joining all female bands in the fear that their talent would be disregarded in such a context. Yet all female bands were also forced into the feminine appearances they were also demeaned for. In many ways, this made being in a traveling dance band more difficult for women than it had been for men. After a night spent traveling women were expected to be visions of beauty with perfect make up, hair, and personalities. Often the ultra feminine clothes they had to wear, such as strapless dress and high heels, also affected their ability to play and perform. As had been shown in previous attempts women had made to broach men's groups, attempting to break away from this dainty female image, could call the sexuality and morality of a performer into question. Yet women's performances were also often debased to their visual looks and sexual attractiveness, even though many reviewers criticized them for these elements.

A certain need to prove themselves seemed to exist among many of the female musicians who worked in dance bands. These performers inherited a lot of the stereotypes that surrounded their previous female performer counterparts: chorus line girls and girl singers. The sexual objectification of women that haunted those two careers was also a part of being in an all female band. Furthermore, chorus line girls had an association with loose morals and even prostitution, and loss of face for an instrumentalist could mean the end of a career. These kinds of associations also made many people assume that female instrumentalists were not talented players. Upon interviewing later in life, many women insisted that they were talented musicians who knew how to play. This insistence seems to be in direct reaction to the claims that circulated that female musicians were not meant to play well, but simply to look pretty. While it is true that many agencies required photographs in their applications to join female bands, the musicians in them still tended to be quite talented.

While many people view the end of the swing era as the opening of World War II, this was not the case for all woman dance bands. Instead, they flourished during the 1940s. Swing music became a form of patriotism to a country at war. The all-girl bands that did the best at this time, tended to be groups formed before American involvement in the war. Once it was realized that women could fill a major hole in the entertainment industry and that they could not be drafted, agencies and managers everywhere began trying to put together all female bands. In many ways, these musicians were very prepared to take over for the men because they had more advanced experience in playing instruments, either from hobbies or school bands. They were certainly more prepared for musical performance than many women were prepared for welding and factory work. Some groups connected to academic organizations, such as the International Sweethearts of Rhythm or the Prairie View Co-eds did very well at this time. These groups of industrious young women could come to represent an image of what the United States was at war for. Some of these groups even did USO tours. Soldiers shipped off to foreign lands, under the pressure war and deprived of any female presence were more than welcoming to these all woman groups. The armed audiences were known to have shown extreme appreciation for these female performers V-discs, recorded for broadcast on the Armed Forces Radio Network, often featured all-girl groups.

=== Ethnicity and race ===
There were black bands and white bands, and bands of various immigrant ethnicities. There were also all-female bands, such as the International Sweethearts of Rhythm.

Musician, composer, and scholar Gunther Schuller asserted in one of his books, The Swing Era: The Development of Jazz, 1930–1945 (The History of Jazz, Vol. 2) that, "territory bands, by definition, were black. There were, of course, many white bands in the 'territories' but they tended to have the more lucrative and permanent jobs and therefore not required to travel as much as the black bands." Another musician (former territory band musician and historian), Jack Behrens, expressed in a book that Schuller's depiction of divergent work conditions was narrow. "During my playing days in the 1940s and 50s in several white territory bands, we didn't have "lucrative and permanent jobs" unless you count day labor in a dairy bar or clerking at a military surplus store. Worse, there were times we didn't get paid at all and we had little recourse given the cost of legal advice."

For most territory bands — whether black, white, integrated, male, female — the musicians were nearly always paid. Neither the booking agencies nor the musicians got rich, but regular salaries helped maintain somewhat decent musicianship.

Most musicians witnessed and experienced Jim Crow laws. One common present-day misconception is that Jim Crow practices were more prevalent in the South. The practices were prevalent everywhere, especially in New York City and the Midwest. The bands that were racially integrated commonly experienced problems, mostly from having to dodge different applications and degrees of Jim Crow among cities and regions. Many bands, especially The International Sweethearts of Rhythm, handled some of the absurdities with a degree of inward, sarcastic humor. When musicians grew wary or even felt vulnerable to injustices of Jim Crow, the band bus, for those who had one, served as a safe haven.

== Bands and bandleaders ==
=== Alabama ===
- Carolina Cotton Pickers

=== Arkansas ===
- Original Yellowjackets

=== Colorado ===
- George Morrison

=== Florida ===
- Ross De Luxe Syncopators
- Smiling Billy Stewart's Celery City Serenaders (Florida)

=== Georgia ===
- J. Neal Montgomery & His Orchestra (Henry Mason, Trumpet) (Atlanta)

=== Illinois ===
- Earl Hines (Chicago)

=== Missouri ===
- Art Bronson's Bostonians
- Coon-Sanders Original Nighthawk Orchestra
- Andy Kirk and his Twelve Clouds of Joy (Kansas City)
- George E. Lee and His Singing Novelty Orchestra (Kansas City)
- Bennie Moten's Kansas City Orchestra
- Jeter-Pillars Club Plantation Orchestra
- Original Saint Louis Crackerjacks
- Red Perkins & His Dixie Ramblers

=== Nebraska ===
- Little John Beecher
- Verne Byers Orchestra
- Bob Calame
- Lloyd Hunter's Serenaders
- Al Hudson
- Preston Love
- Clarence Love
- Dick Mango Orchestra
- Walter Martie
- Nat Towles
- Anna Mae Winburn

=== New York ===
- Cab Calloway (New York)
- Casa Loma Orchestra (Detroit, then New York)
- Harlem Playgirls
- Edgar Hayes (New York)
- Gene Kardos & His Orchestra (New York)
- Jimmie Lunceford's Orchestra (Buffalo)
- Mills Blue Rhythm Band (New York)
- Dave Nelson's Harlem Hot Shots (New York)
- Willard Robison & His Orchestra (New York)
- Savoy Sultans (Savoy in Harlem)
- Chick Webb (New York)

=== Oklahoma ===
- Walter Page's Oklahoma City Blue Devils

=== Ohio ===
- Chubb-Steinberg Orchestra
- The Wolverines
- Austin Wylie's Golden Pheasant Orchestra
- Zach Whyte's Chocolate Beau Brummels

=== Tennessee ===
- Snooks and His Memphis Stompers
- Slim Lamar and his Southerners
- Mart Britt and his Orchestra

=== Texas ===
- Don Albert Band
- Blue Syncopaters, El Paso
- Joe Buzze and His Orchestra, Waco
- Sunny Clapp's Band
- Happy Black Aces
- Clifford "Boots" Douglas and his Buddies
- Troy Floyd San Antonio
- Fred Gardner's Texas University Troubadours
- Milt Larkins, Houston
- Peck's Bad Boys (Peck Kelley)
- Alphonso Trent

=== Wisconsin ===
- Grant Moore and His Black Devils, Milwaukee
- Johnny Nugent Band Fox Valley

== See also ==
- Fred Astaire
- Vernon and Irene Castle
- Big bands
- Castle Walk
- East Coast Swing
- Jive
- Lindy Hop
- National Ballroom Operators Association
- Swing dance
- Swing era
- Swing music
- West Coast Swing
