= National Ballroom Operators Association =

National Ballroom Operators Association (NBOA) was an American organization reflecting its namesake that existed from the 1930s through the late 1960s. Member owners and operators of ballrooms used the association to lobby the government for tax considerations and to bargain with labor unions.

== State Chapters ==
Ballroom operators within several states formed "State Chapters."
