= 1581 in music =

== Events ==
- October 15 – Performance of Ballet Comique de la Reine, the first narrative ballet (incorporating the story of Circe), devised by Louise of Lorraine, wife of Henry III of France, with music by the royal master of music Jacques Salmon and the bass singer Girard de Beaulieu and choreography by Balthasar de Beaujoyeulx, opens at the court of Catherine de' Medici in the Louvre Palace in Paris as part of the wedding celebrations for Marguerite of Lorraine.
- Ginés Pérez de la Parra becomes composer and musical director at Orihuela cathedral.
- Marc'Antonio Ingegneri becomes maestro di cappella of Cremona cathedral.

== Publications ==
=== Music ===
- Lodovico Agostini – L'Echo et enigmi musicali for six voices, book 2 (Venice: Alessandro Gardano)
- Costanzo Antegnati – Sacrae cantiones (motets) for four voices (Brescia: Vincenzo Sabbio)
- Giammateo Asola – Secundus liber in quo reliquae missae octonis compositae tonis (Venice: Angelo Gardano)
- Joachim a Burck – Threnodia (Komm wenn du wilt Herr Jesu Christ) for four voices (Frankfurt: Nikolaus Basse)
- Severin Cornet
  - Cantiones musicae for five, six, seven, and eight voices (Antwerp: Christophe Plantin)
  - Chansons françoyses for five, six, and eight voices (Antwerp: Christophe Plantin)
  - Madrigals for five, six, seven, and eight voices (Antwerp: Christophe Plantin)
- Giovanni Dragoni – First book of madrigals for four voices (Venice: heirs of Girolamo Scotto)
- Paolo Isnardi
  - Second book of masses for five voices (Venice: Angelo Gardano)
  - Third book of madrigals for five voices (Venice: heirs of Girolamo Scotto)
- Orlande de Lassus
  - Masses for four and five voices (Nuremberg: Katharina Gerlach)
  - Book of villanelle, moresche, and other songs for four, five, six, and eight voices (Paris: Le Roy & Ballard)
- Giovanni de Macque – Madrigaletti et Napolitane for six voices (Venice: Angelo Gardano)
- Luca Marenzio
  - First book of madrigals for six voices (Venice: Angelo Gardano)
  - Second book of madrigals for five voices (Venice: Angelo Gardano)
- Rinaldo del Mel – First book of motets for four, five, six, seven, and eight voices (Venice: Angelo Gardano)
- Philippe de Monte
  - First book of madrigali spirituali for five voices (Venice: Angelo Gardano)
  - Tenth book of madrigals for five voices (Venice: heirs of Girolamo Scotto)
  - Fourth book of madrigals for four voices (Venice: Angelo Gardano)
- Giovanni Maria Nanino & Annibal Stabile – Madrigals for five voices (Venice: Angelo Gardano)
- Giovanni Pierluigi da Palestrina — First book of madrigals for five voices
- Benedetto Pallavicino – First book of madrigals for five voices (Venice: Angelo Gardano)
- Christoph Praetorius – Fröliche und liebliche Ehrnlieder for four voices (Wittenberg: Matthäus Welack), in two volumes

=== Other ===
- Fabritio Caroso – Il Ballerino, Italian dance manual, containing much dance music
- Vincenzo Galilei – Dialogo della musica antica, et della moderna (Dialogue Concerning Ancient and Modern Music)

== Classical music ==
- none listed

== Births ==
- July 2 – Johann Staden, German organist and composer (d. 1634)

== Deaths ==
- May 7 – Alexander Utendal, Flemish composer (born 1543/45)
- date unknown – Joachim Thibault de Courville, French composer, singer, lutenist and player of the lyre
- probable – Antoine de Bertrand (born 1530/1540)
