= Girard de Beaulieu =

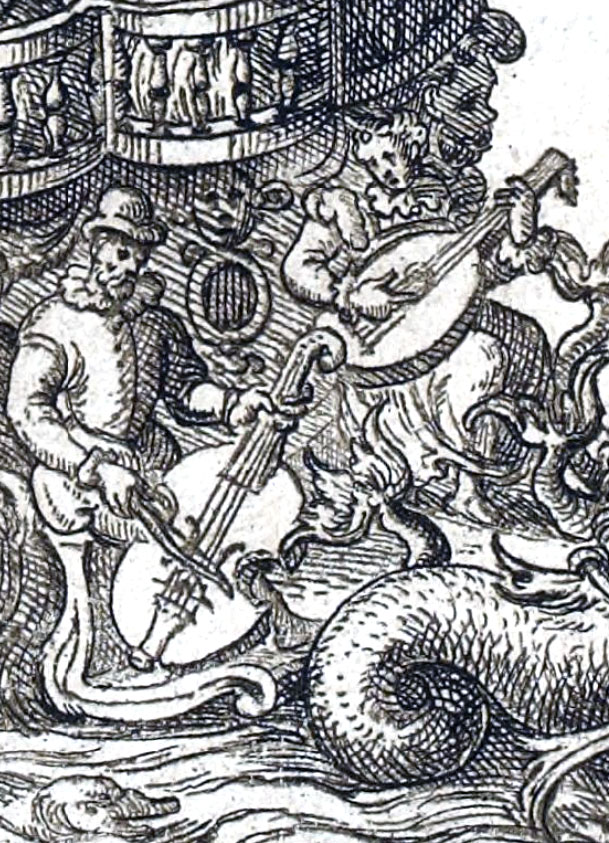
Detail showing Girard de Beaulieu and his wife Violante Doria, from Jacques Patin's engraving 'Figure de la Fontaine' in Balet comique de la Royne

Girard de Beaulieu, better known by the incorrectly recorded name Lambert de Beaulieu (? – after 1587) was a French bass singer, instrumentalist, and composer. He was employed at the court of Henri III as basse singer and composer from 1559. He was associated with the Académie de Baïf, one of whose aristocratic poets, Nicolas Filleul de La Chesnaye, the king's almoner, was to provide the lyrics for the ballet Circé in the first French ballet de cour, the Balet Comique de la Royne of 1581, for which Beaulieu and Jacques Salmon provided the music. Choreography and overall direction were provided by the Italian dancing master Baltazarini, known as Balthasar de Beaujoyeulx. Sets and costumes were provided by Jacques Patin.

Beaulieu's wife was the Genoese soprano and lutenist Violante Doria. They had a daughter Claude de Beaulieu who later was paid as a lutenist at the court.

The original documents of 1581 indicate the composer only as "Sieur de Beaulieu". The error concerning his name, and consequent separation of the bass singer and composer into two biographies, is due to an erroneous "Lambert de Beaulieu" in a letter by Rudolf II, Holy Roman Emperor to the French king attempting to employ the composer Beaulieu for his own court. The error in Rudolf's letter was reproduced by François-Joseph Fétis in his influential Biographie universelle des musiciens.

== Works, editions and recordings ==
- Lambert de Beaulieu, Airs
- Lambert de Beaulieu, Balthasar de Beaujoyeulx: Balet Comique de la Royne 1581. Ensemble Elyma, K617 080, 1998
