= Violante Doria =

Italian opera singer

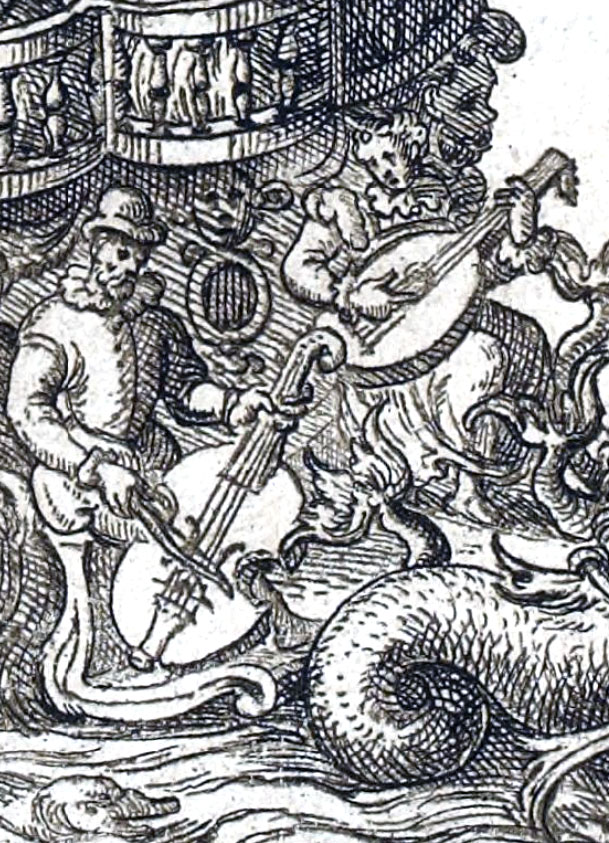
Detail showing Violante Doria and her husband Girard de Beaulieu, from the engraving 'Figure de la Fontaine' in Balet comique de la Royne

Violante Doria (fl. mid-1500s), also known as Yolande or Yolante, was an Italian soprano from Genoa. She was considered to be one of “the most successful musicians in France during the reigns of the last Valois kings.” She was married to bass singer Girard de Beaulieu who was a well-known and important singer of the royal court from as early as 1572 until the last year of his life in 1590.” The couple played a large role in the creation of the French ballet de cour, the Balet comique de la royne, in 1581. The successful careers of both Doria and her husband were an important part of structuring the music of the royal court and show the significance in the rise of chamber music.

== Le Balet comique de la royne ==
The Balet comique de la royne, later known as the Ballet Comique de la Reine, was created in October 1581 under the reign of King Henry III as a celebration of the marriage of the Duc de Joyeuse and the queen’s sister, Marguerite of Lorraine-Vaudémont. It was performed at the French court of Catherine de Médicis and was the first ballet to have a physical printed account (libretto). This five-hour show was created by Italian choreographer and musician Balthazar de Beaujoyeulx and is considered the first ballet to have created a theatrical experience by combining dance, music, sets, poetry, etc. This massive production cost 3,600,000 gold francs and was only performed once due to this high cost, however it had a major influence on the development of ballet, theatrical dance, and opera.

The music of Doria and Beaulieu is characterized as the new music of the early Baroque period. The music was also solo dialogue, which is a genre that was originally thought of as more representative of the seventeenth century. The duet of Doria and Beaulieu was “the only solo dialogue to appear in print as such in France before 1611.”

In the Balet comique de la royne, Doria played the part of Tethys, the goddess of the sea opposite her husband, Beaulieu playing Glaucus, the god of the sea. The two singers also accompanied themselves, with Doria playing the lute and Beaulieu a bass bowed string instrument. According to the Encyclopædia Britannica, “Florid and vocally demanding solo interventions by Glaucus and Tethys alternate with a five-part vocal and instrumental refrain performed by royal chamber musicians representing tritons or sea gods.” Doria was considered to have great skill as a performer due to the music given to her in the Balet comique de la royne.

== Women in the Arts ==
Women are often given credit for the start of the musical arts. This stems from their ability to speak eloquently and the sweet quality of their voice. It was common to connect the ideas and skills of speaking and singing. Like with speech, the acceptance of women in music was dependent upon their class. It was advocated for courtly women, but discouraged among merchant women, drawing into question the idea of feminine virtue. For these women, music was seen as a useless distraction from the household management. “And singing could also be far worse than useless, for it was not only a desirable accomplishment for courtiers but also for courtesans, and the display of musical skill—like the display of verbal proficiency—could serve as sign of sexual availability and excess.”

== Payments ==
In many records, Doria is not referred to as a musician. She is called a lady-in-waiting, ‘sa femme,’ one of the queen’s ladies, or just is not identified for the service she provided. These kinds of references make it hard to truly understand what women in the musical profession did in early modern France. In a record of payment to both Doria and her husband, Beaulieu is titled as a royal musician, but she is listed as simply “his wife.” The two were often paid as a couple, as opposed to individually. The couple received the substantial amount of 2,000 livres for an annual royal pension.

“The royal pension list of 1578 specified that Beaulieu and Doria were to receive 200 livres per annum as pension for the king and 1,000 livres from the queen, suggesting that even after Beaulieu gained a post in the royal chamber the couple were still considered members of the queen’s entourage.”

It was rare for women to be paid at all for their services in the king’s household; in fact most workers were male. According to Jeanice Brooks, “Violante Doria was the first woman to be paid explicitly for musical services in any royal account of the sixteenth century, including those of the queens and royal siblings as well as those of the treasury and maison du roi.” Doria and her daughter, Claude de Beaulieu, were the only two women who were recorded as being paid for their work as musicians in the royal accounts.

== Children ==
Violante Doria and Girard de Beaulieu had two daughters. Marguerite and Claude de Beaulieu. In December of 1580, Maurguerite was to marry Anthoine de Minard, a nobleman and she identified herself as “the daughter of ‘noblehomme Girard de Beaulieu valet de chambdre ordinaire du roy et de demoiselle Violante Doria dame de la Royne.’” This, along with her above average dowry, suggests the immense success and possible nobility of Beaulieu and Doria.

Like her parents, Claude de Beaulieu became a royal musician. After 1588, the payments from the royal records begin to refer to Claude instead of Doria. “In the queen’s household list for the following year, her place was taken by her daughter; the joint position formerly occupied by Beaulieu and Doria was now awarded to Beaulieu and ‘Claude de Beaulieu sa fille musicienne et joueuse de lut de la reyne’ (his daughter Claude de Beaulieu, musician and lute player to the queen) with the same yearly wage of 400 ecus.”

== Death ==
There are no accounts or records of Violante Doria’s death. However, after 1588, there is no other mention of Doria in the royal records. “She may have died, fallen ill or retired from service at court.”

== Bibliography ==
"Ballet Comique De La Reine." Encyclopædia Britannica Online. Accessed May 4, 2016. http://www.britannica.com/topic/Ballet-comique-de-la-reine.

“Balthazar De Beaujoyeulx." Dance National Arts Centre. Accessed May 2, 2016. http://artsalive.ca/en/dan/meet/bios/artistDetail.asp?artistID=26.

"Balthazar De Beaujoyeulx." Encyclopædia Britannica Online. Accessed May 4, 2016. http://www.britannica.com/biography/Balthazar-de-Beaujoyeulx.

Brooks, Jeanice. Courtly Song in Late Sixteenth-century France. Chicago: University of Chicago Press, 2000.

Brooks, Jeanice. “O Quelle Armonye: Dialogue Singing in Late Renaissance France.” Early Music History: Studies in Medieval and Early Modern Music 22, 1-65. RILM Abstracts of Music Literature, 2003. (accessed March 30, 2016).
