= Catherine de' Medici's court festivals =

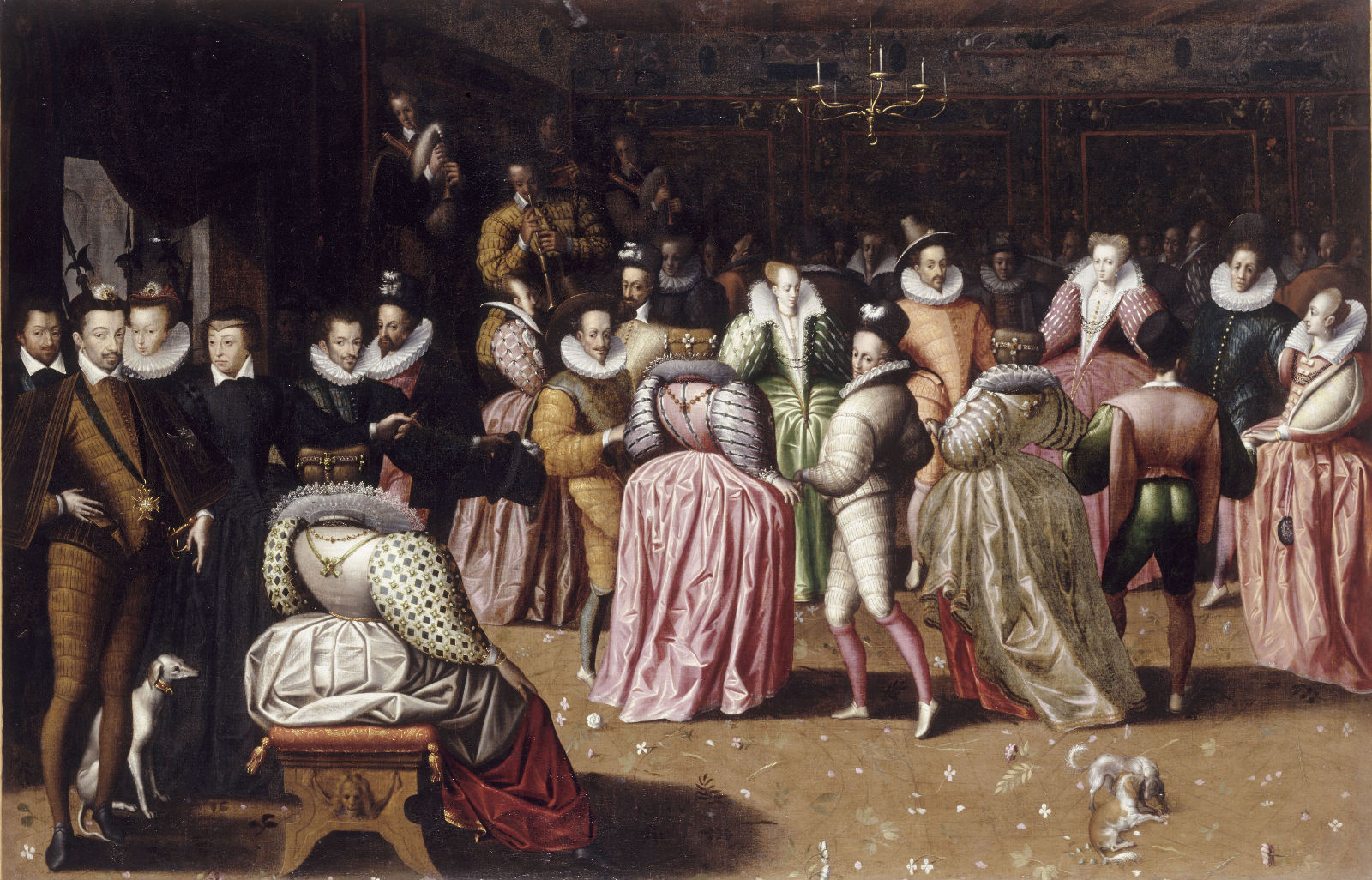
Ball at the Court of Henri III, Franco-Flemish school, c. 1582. Catherine de' Medici is fourth from the left, in mourning garb.

A series of lavish and spectacular court entertainments, sometimes called magnificences, were laid on by Catherine de' Medici, the queen consort of France from 1547 to 1559 and queen mother from 1559 until her death in 1589. As wife of Henry II of France, Catherine showed interest in the arts and theatre, but it was not until she attained real political and financial power as queen mother that she began the series of tournaments and entertainments that dazzled her contemporaries and continue to fascinate scholars. Biographer Leonie Frieda suggests that "Catherine, more than anyone, inaugurated the fantastic entertainments for which later French monarchs also became renowned".

For Catherine, these entertainments served a political purpose that made them worth their colossal expense. She presided over the royal government at a time when the French monarchy was in steep decline. With three of her sons on the throne in succession and the country torn by religious civil war, Catherine set out to show not only the French people but foreign courts that the Valois monarchy was as prestigious and magnificent as it had been during the reigns of Francis I and her husband Henry II. At the same time, she believed these elaborate entertainments and sumptuous court rituals, which incorporated martial sports and tournaments of many kinds, would occupy her feuding nobles and distract them from fighting against each other to the detriment of the country and the royal authority.

It is clear, however, that Catherine regarded these festivals as more than political and pragmatic exercises: she revelled in them as a vehicle for her creative gifts. A highly talented and artistic woman, Catherine took the lead in devising and planning her own musical-mythological shows. Though they were ephemeral, her "magnificences"—as the contemporary commentator Pierre de Bourdeille, seigneur de Brantôme, called them—are studied by modern scholars as works of art. Historian Frances Yates has called Catherine "a great creative artist in festivals". She employed the leading artists and architects of the day to create the necessary dramas, music, and scenic effects for these events, which were usually dedicated to the ideal of peace and based on mythological themes.

It is difficult for scholars to piece together the exact form of the entertainments, but clues have been gleaned from the written accounts, scripts, artworks, and tapestries that derived from these famous occasions. Though such sources must be treated with caution, since they contain demonstrable inaccuracies and contradictions, they provide evidence of the richness and scale of Catherine de' Medici's court festivals.

== Entertainments ==
Catherine de' Medici's investment in magnificent entertainments was part of a conscious political programme. She recalled the belief of her father-in-law, King Francis I, that the court needed to be physically active and constantly entertained. She also declared her intention to imitate the Roman emperors, who kept their subjects from mischief by occupying them with games and amusements. She therefore adopted a policy of distracting her nobles from fighting among themselves by laying on irresistible entertainments and sports for them at court.

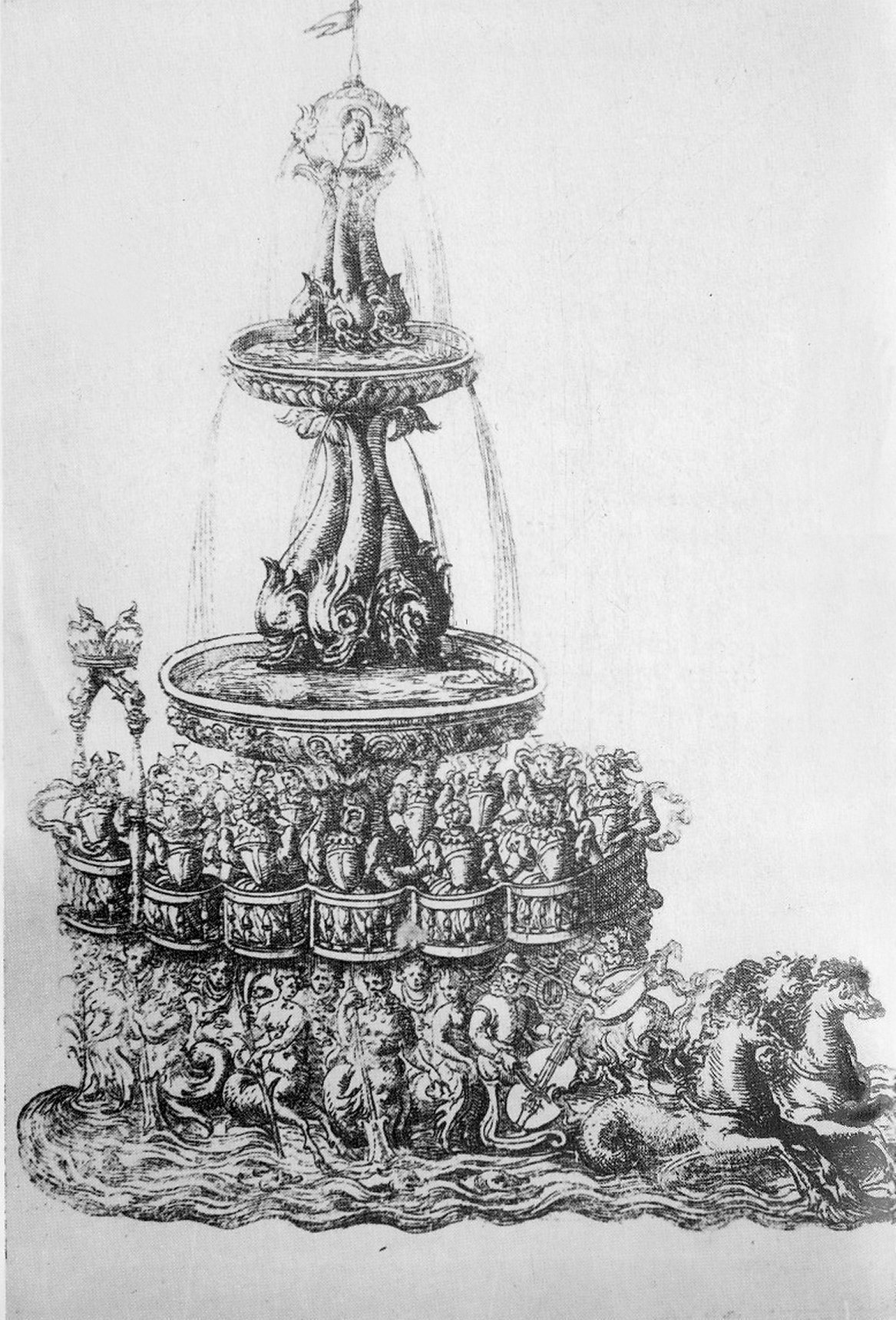
In the Ballet Comique de la Reine, 1581, a fountain chariot carried Queen Louise and her ladies and musicians. Engraving by Jacques Patin.

Catherine also maintained about eighty alluring ladies-in-waiting at court, whom she allegedly used as tools to seduce courtiers for political ends. These women became known as her "flying squadron" (L'Escadron volant (fr). Catherine did not hesitate to use the charms of her ladies as an attraction of the court. In 1577 she threw a banquet at which the food was served by topless women. In 1572, the Huguenot Queen Jeanne d’Albret of Navarre, wrote from the court to warn her son Henry that Catherine presided over a "vicious and corrupt" atmosphere, in which the women made the sexual advances and not the men. In fact, Charlotte de Sauve, one of the most notorious members of the "flying squadron", first seduced and then became a mistress of Henry of Navarre on Catherine's orders. On the other hand, Brantôme, in his Memoirs, praised Catherine's court as "a school of all honesty and virtue".

In the tradition of sixteenth-century royal festivals, Catherine de' Medici's magnificences took place over several days, with a different entertainment each day. Often individual nobles or members of the royal family were responsible for preparing one particular entertainment. Spectators and participants, including those involved in martial sports, would dress up in costumes representing mythological or romantic themes. Catherine gradually introduced changes to the traditional form of these entertainments. She forbade heavy tilting of the sort that led to the death of her husband in 1559; and she developed and increased the prominence of dance in the shows that climaxed each series of entertainments. As a result, the ballet de cour, a distinctive new art form, emerged from the creative advances in court entertainment devised by Catherine de' Medici.

=== Fontainebleau ===
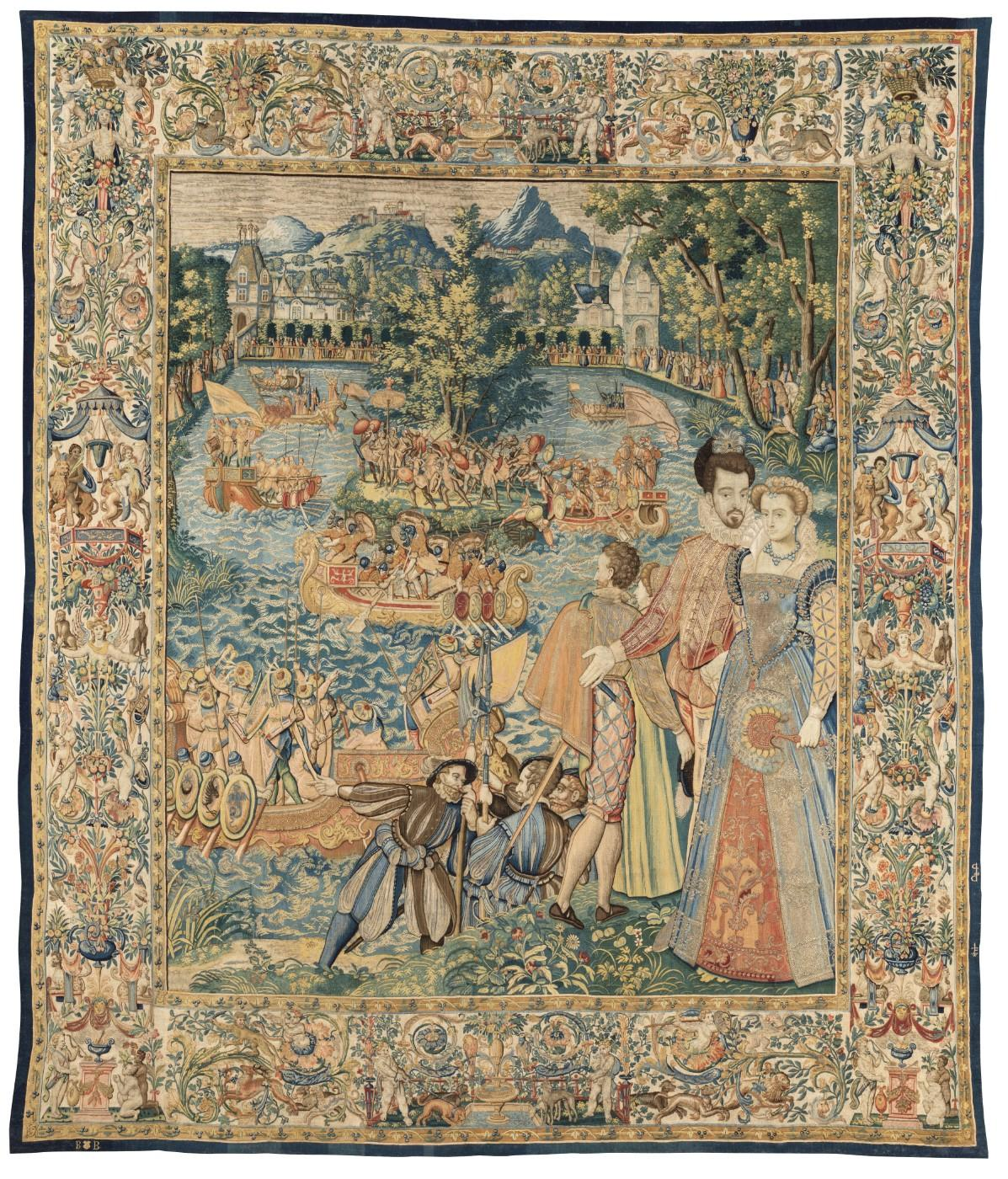
One of the Valois Tapestries, depicting entertainments at Fontainebleau in 1564, including the mock rescue of captive damsels from an enchanted island.

In January 1564, Catherine and the young Charles IX embarked on a royal progress that was to last nearly two and a half years. They were accompanied by what has been described as a city on the move, including the King's Council and foreign ambassadors who Catherine hoped would report to their governments on the splendour of the train, offsetting any idea that the French monarchy was on the verge of bankruptcy. The royal household included Catherine's courtiers and "flying squadron", as well as her musicians and nine essential dwarves who travelled in their own miniature coaches. The party carried with it all the equipment and paraphernalia required for the festivals, feasts, masques, and joyeuses entrées planned to take place along the route. These included portable triumphal arches and the royal barges.

Catherine had ordered that at the Château de Fontainebleau, each important noble should host a ball. She herself held a banquet in a meadow at the château's dairy, where her courtiers dressed as shepherds and shepherdesses. That evening, the court watched a comedy in the great ballroom, which was followed by a ball where 300 "beauties dressed in gold and silver cloth" performed a choreographed dance.

At Fontainebleau, Catherine arranged entertainments that lasted for several days, including fancy-dress jousting and chivalrous events in allegorical settings. On Mardi Gras, the day after the banquet in the meadow, knights dressed as Greeks and Trojans fought over scantily clad damsels trapped by a giant and a dwarf in a tower on an enchanted island. The fighting climaxed with the tower losing its magical properties and bursting into flames. In another spectacle, singing sirens swam past the king, and Neptune floated by in a chariot drawn by seahorses.

=== Bayonne ===
As the high point of the royal progress, Catherine scheduled a meeting with her daughter Elisabeth, the third wife of Philip II of Spain. Catherine was so determined to make a magnificent impression on the Spanish court that she indulged in a spending spree that was extravagant even by her own standards. To help pay for the planned pageantry and entertainments, she borrowed 700,000 écus from the Gondi bank. Catherine had assumed she would also be meeting King Philip himself, but early in the tour, he sent word that he would not be attending. He was outraged that Catherine, whom he called "Madame La Serpente", had received an embassy from the Sultan of Turkey. He also objected to her Edict of Amboise (1563), which had offered concessions to the Huguenots. In short, French religious policy disgusted him. In his place he sent "the severe and ferocious" Duke of Alba, with orders to convince Catherine that persecuting, imprisoning, and torturing Huguenots was the way to deal with heretics, not making treaties with them. In the event, Catherine left Alba befuddled by her darting mind. He found her far more interested in discussing marriage alliances and in showing him what the French court could lay on in the way of fabulous entertainments.

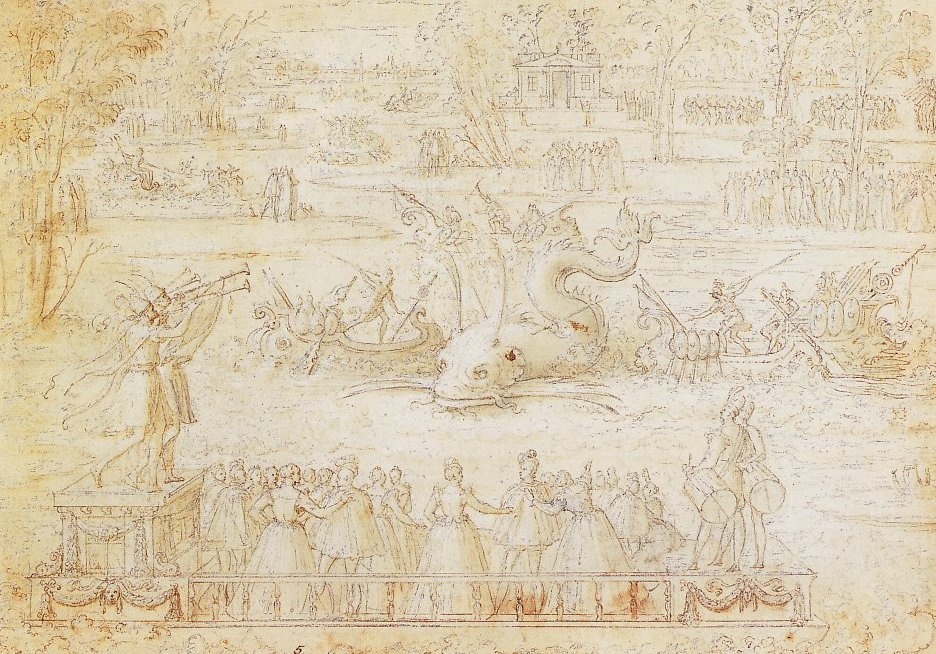
Water Festival at Bayonne, a tapestry design by Antoine Caron, records entertainments laid on by Catherine de' Medici for the Franco-Spanish summit meeting of 1565.

Elisabeth and her Spanish entourage had arrived at the Bidasoa river on the Spanish border with a huge escort of French Catholic nobles on 14 June 1565. She then rode into Saint-Jean de Luz, where Catherine greeted her tearfully with embraces and kisses. During the reception ceremonies, ten of Catherine's soldiers dropped dead from standing too long in the heat in their armour. The next day, Elisabeth made a dazzling entry into Bayonne on a horse whose harness was studded with gems worth 400,000 ducats.

The encounter between the two courts was marked by ritual exchanges of costly gifts and a sustained display of ballets, jousts, mock battles, and decorative arts. Several accounts of the Bayonne entertainments survive. One spectacle, mounted on the Bidasoa river, is a particularly famous example of Catherine's entertainments as ephemeral works of art. The entertainments began with a banquet on the Île d’Aguineau. As guests were ferried on decorated boats to the island, they passed, among other spectacles, Arion riding two dolphins, harpoonists spearing an artificial whale that spouted red wine, and six tritons sitting on a giant turtle, blowing conch shells. Charles IX was transported on a barge dressed to look like a floating fortress. The banquet was followed by a ballet of nymphs and satyrs. Brantôme reported that the "magnificence was such in everything that the Spaniards who are very contemptuous of all others save their own swore that they had never seen anything finer".

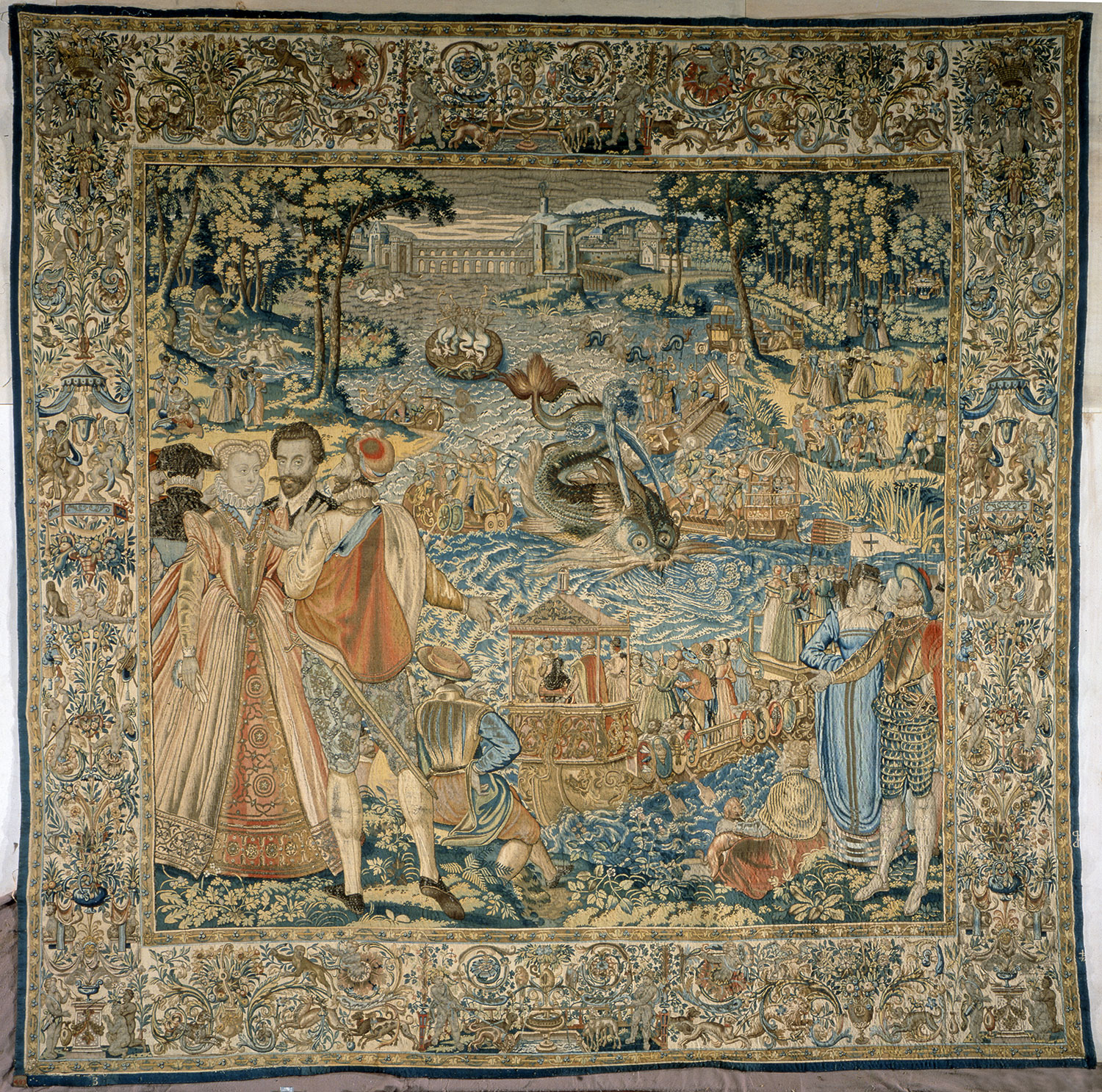
Water Festival at Bayonne, the finished tapestry version of 1580–81

The next day, King Charles and his brother Henry took part in a tournament, leading teams dressed as British and Irish knights. The theme of the tournament, "virtue and love", was represented by two chariots, one containing ladies dressed as the five virtues, the other carrying Venus and Cupid and many mini-cupids. In the tournament itself, little balls of fire were lobbed among the horses as they crossed. The royal grandstand was hung with gold-and-silk tapestries illustrating the triumph of Scipio, which Giulio Romano had designed for Francis I. Brantôme recalled in his memoirs that "the Spanish lords and ladies greatly admired it, never having seen anything like it in the possession of their king". Another French spectator recorded, "Strangers of all nations were now forced to recognise that in these things France had surpassed, with these parades, bravado, glories and magnificences, all other nations and even herself".

Catherine believed she had shown Spain that the French monarchy, far from being financially ruined and at war with its nobles, remained a glorious force to be reckoned with, capable of financing displays on a stunning scale, backed by a unified court. The point was lost on the grim Duke of Alba, however. His letters reveal his frustration that Catherine's spectacles kept interrupting the serious business of discussing how to make war on the Protestants. In the end, the Spanish decided the whole meeting been a waste of time, since Catherine had refused to change her policy towards the Huguenots in the slightest. The Huguenots, however, believed that their banishment from the talks between the two negotiating teams meant that Catherine had struck a secret deal with the Spanish to persecute them.

=== Royal wedding ===
The celebrations following the marriage of Catherine's daughter Marguerite to the Protestant Henry of Navarre in Paris on 18 August 1572, were based on Huguenot themes. The match was controversial because Marguerite was marrying a Huguenot. The pope refused to grant a dispensation for the marriage, and the different faiths of the bridal couple made for an unusual wedding service. After a nuptial lunch, four days of balls, masques and banquets ensued.

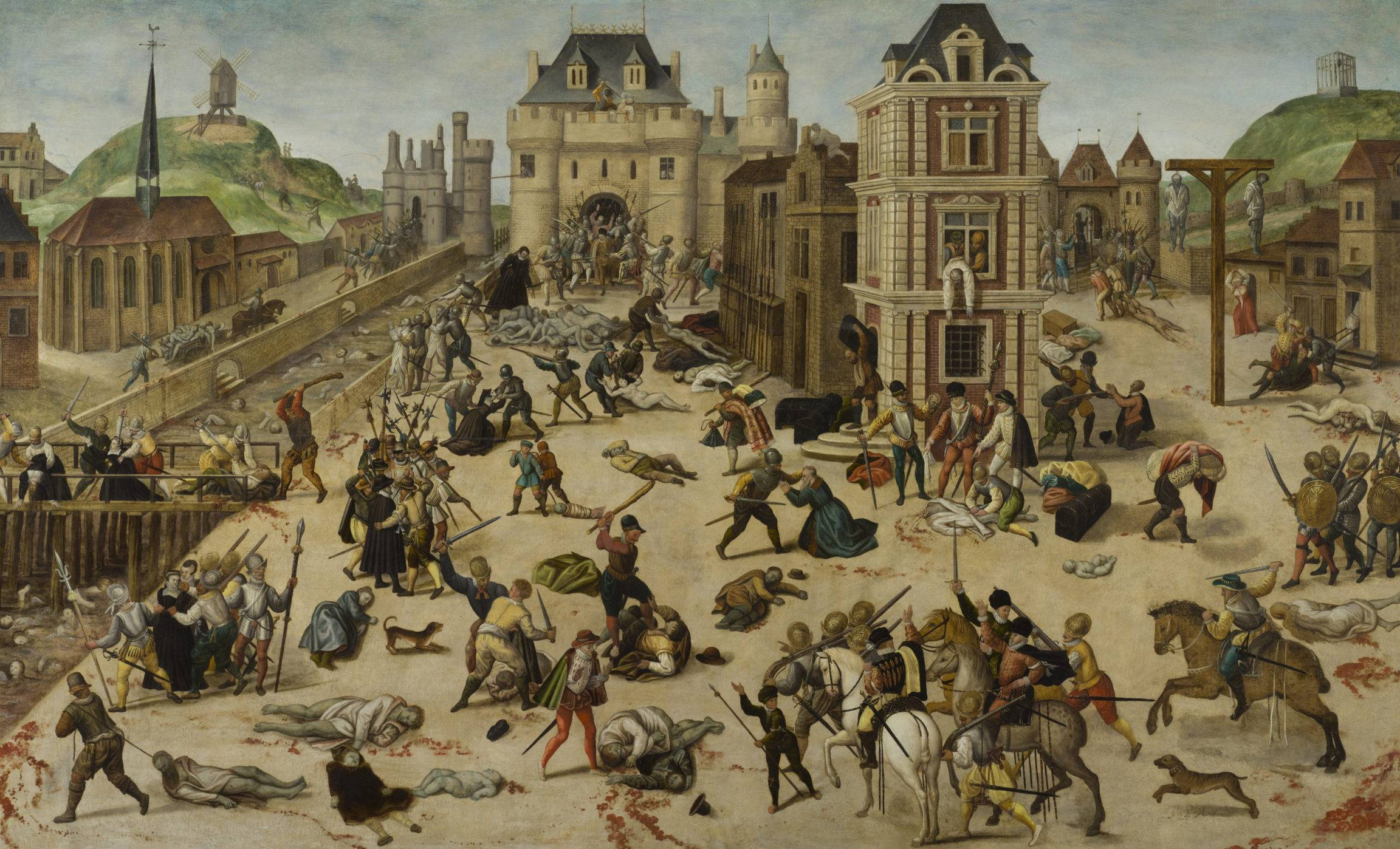
A painting by François Dubois, depicts Catherine de' Medici (rear left) standing over a heap of corpses during the St. Bartholomew's Day massacre. The body of Admiral Coligny is being thrown from a window.

Despite the tension between Catholic and Huguenot forces in the city, the festivities proceeded in a good-natured fashion, though the themes of the entertainments may seem "very near to the bone", in retrospect. The night after the wedding, a magnificent masked ball was held at the Petit-Bourbon, which included the performance of a pantomime tournoi, called the "paradise of love". King Charles and his two brothers defended twelve angelic nymphs against the Huguenots. They despatched the Huguenots, led by Henry of Navarre, into a hell where, according to an observer, "a great number of devils and imps were making infinite follery and noise". The nymphs then danced a ballet. There followed combat between knights, accompanied by explosions of gunpowder. The king and his brothers climaxed proceedings by rescuing the Huguenots from hell, which was separated from paradise by a river on which floated the ferryman Charon in his boat.

The remaining festivities were called off after an assassination attempt on the Huguenot leader Admiral Coligny, who was shot from a house by an arquebusier on 22 August and wounded in the elbow and hand. The day before, the king and his brothers had dressed as Amazons to fight Navarre and his friends, who wore turbans and golden robes in the role of Turks. Fighting broke out for real between the Catholics and Huguenots in the St. Bartholomew's Day massacre, which began on 24 August when Charles IX ordered the slaughter of all the Huguenot leaders in Paris, provoking massacres of Huguenots throughout France. Henry of Navarre was given the choice of death, life imprisonment, or conversion to Catholicism. He chose Catholicism and was spared.

=== Tuileries ===
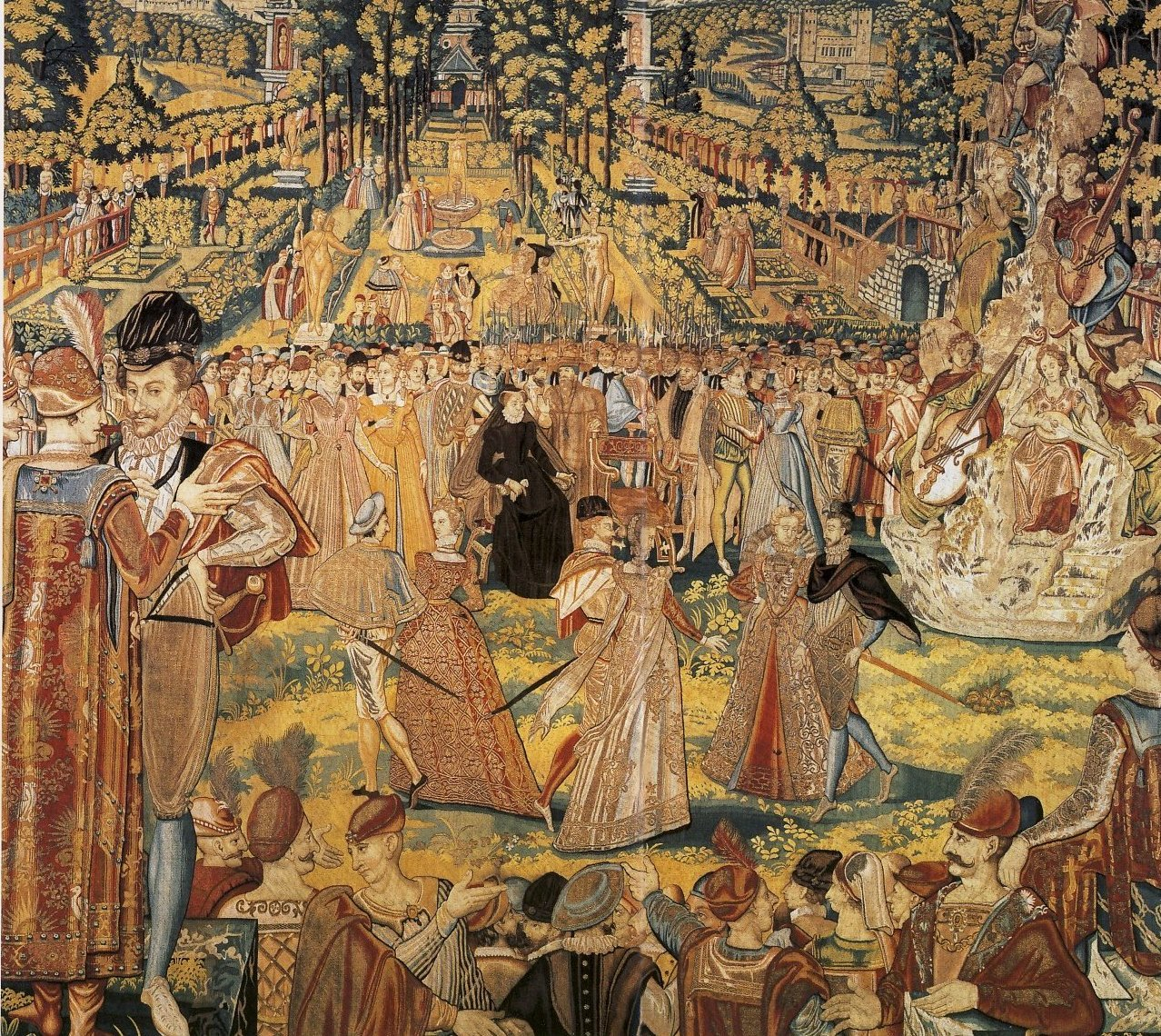
Valois tapestry depicting the ball held by Catherine de' Medici in 1573 at the Tuileries in honour of Polish envoys visiting to present the throne of Poland to Henry, Duke of Anjou

A year after the massacre, in August 1573, Catherine hosted another lavish set of entertainments, this time for the Polish ambassadors who had arrived to offer the throne of Poland to her son, Henry, Duke of Anjou. Sports were laid on, including tournaments, mock combats, tilting at the quintain, and running at the ring. Catherine held a grand ball or "festin" at the Tuileries palace, which Jean Dorat described in his illustrated Magnificentissimi spectaculi. Sixteen nymphs, representing each of the French provinces, danced an intricate ballet, distributing devices to the spectators in the process. Brantôme called this performance "the finest ballet that was ever given in this world" and praised Catherine for bringing France so much prestige with "all these inventions". The chronicler Agrippa d'Aubigné recorded that the Poles marvelled at the ballet. Frances Yates has pointed out that the Italian influence on the French ballet de cour owed much to Catherine:

It was invented in the context of the chivalrous pastimes of the court, by an Italian, and a Medici, the Queen Mother. Many poets, artists, musicians, choreographers, contributed to the result, but it was she who was the inventor, one might perhaps say, the producer; she who had the ladies of her court trained to perform these ballets in settings of her devising.

=== Joyeuse magnificences ===
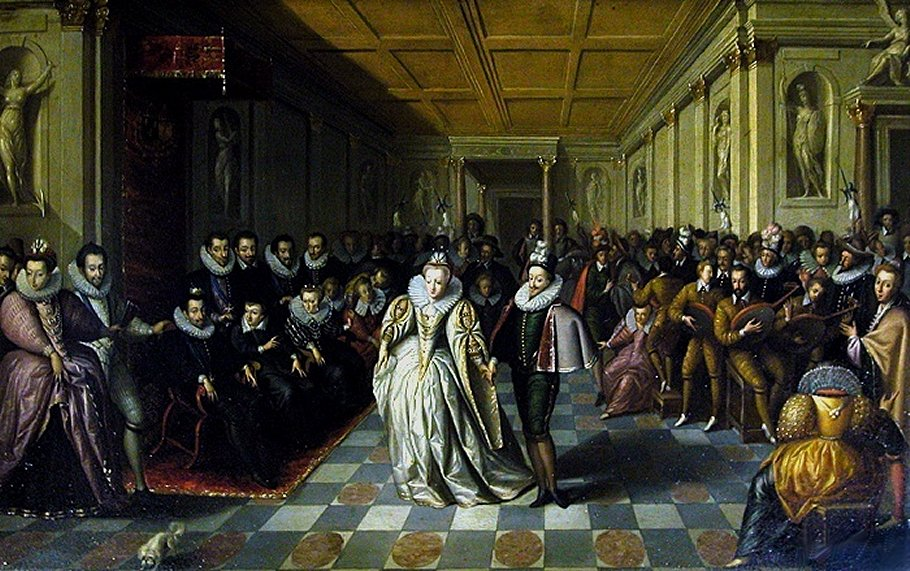
Wedding ball of the Duke of Joyeuse and Marguerite of Lorraine, 24 September 1581. Attributed to Hermann van der Mast, c. 1581–84.

A spectacular fête was held during the reign of Catherine's son Henry III to celebrate the marriage of his sister-in-law, Marguerite of Lorraine, to his favourite, Anne, Duke of Joyeuse, on 24 September 1581. Entertainments were laid on almost every day for two weeks after the wedding, in what art historian Roy Strong has called "the climax of Valois festival art". The chief artist employed to design the magnificences was Antoine Caron, who was aided by the sculptor Germain Pilon. Among the writers were Dorat, Ronsard, and Philippe Desportes; and the music was written by Claude Le Jeune and the Sieur de Beaulieu, among others.

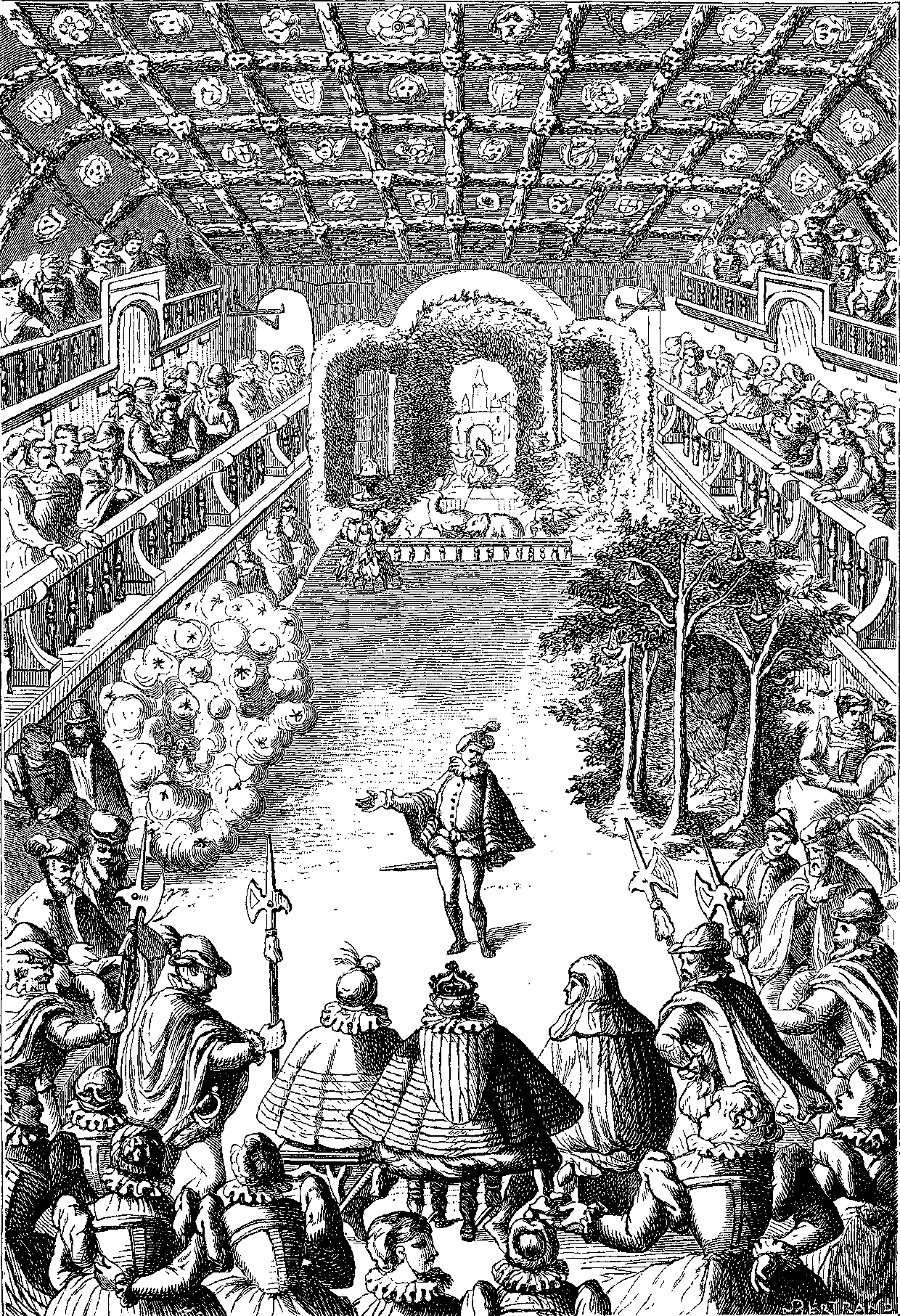
The Ballet Comique de la Reine, from an engraving of 1582 by Jacques Patin

A programme for an entertainment with a sun–moon theme announced that "twelve torch bearers will be men and women disguised as trees ... the golden fruits of which will carry lamps and torches". The visual decorations included two arcades, one shining as a sun, to represent the king, the other as a moon, to represent the newlyweds. The arcades were linked to an amphitheatre overhung with artificial heavens of planets and constellations, and allusions to Catherine's personal emblem, the rainbow. Into this amphitheatre, the king was to enter in a chariot, dressed as the sun.

Another of the Joyeuse magnificences was the Ballet Comique de la Reine, devised and presented by Queen Louise, who directed her own team of writers and musicians. The text was by Nicolas de La Chesnaye, the music by the Sieur de Beaulieu, the sets by Jacques Patin, and the overall director was Balthasar de Beaujoyeulx.

The theme of the entertainment was an invocation of cosmic forces to come to the aid of the monarchy, which at that time was threatened by the rebellion not only of Huguenots but of many Catholic nobles. Men were shown as reduced to beasts by Circe, who held court in a garden at one end of the hall. Louise and her ladies danced ballets, and the Four Cardinal Virtues appealed to the gods to descend to earth and defeat the powers of Circe. With a thunderclap, Jupiter descended sitting on an eagle, accompanied by "the most learned and excellent music that had ever been sung or heard". Jupiter transferred Circe's power to the royal family, protected France from the horrors of civil war, and blessed King Henry with the wisdom to govern. At the end of the show, Catherine de' Medici made Queen Louise give Henry a gold medal depicting a dolphin. The gesture expressed Catherine's desire that the couple would have a male heir (a dauphin) to continue the dynasty.

== See also ==
- Accession Day tilt: equivalent festivities under Elizabeth I of England
- Catherine de' Medici's patronage of the arts
- Intermedio: Italian court spectacles, the most lavish of which celebrated the marriage in 1589 of Catherine's granddaughter Christina of Lorraine to Ferdinando I de' Medici, Grand Duke of Tuscany
