= Rinaldo del Mel =

Franco-Flemish composer

Rinaldo del Mel (also René del Mel, del Melle) (probably 1554 – c. 1598) was a Franco-Flemish composer of the Renaissance, mainly active in Italy, and a member of the Roman School of composition. He likely studied with Palestrina, and was a skilled and prolific composer, especially of cyclic madrigals of the type popular in Rome.

== Life ==
Mel was born in Mechelen to an aristocratic family closely connected to the Duchy of Lorraine; his father was in charge of the financial management of the Duke's estate. In 1562, at the probable age of eight, he began study at the Cathedral of St. Rombaut, with Séverin Cornet being his principal teacher. In 1572, after finishing his schooling, he was sent to Lisbon by his family, where he may have served as maestro di cappella at the court (according to Giuseppe Baini, the 19th century writer on music, who was not always a reliable source). By 1580 he was in Rome, possibly studying with Palestrina. Records indicate he was at Chieti in 1583, and in January 1584 in Venice; in July of that year he accepted a position as maestro di cappella at Rieti Cathedral, but was dismissed shortly thereafter for being too often absent from his duties.

Between 1585 and 1591 Mel traveled widely, returning to Flanders, including Liège and Antwerp. He served briefly as maestro di cappella for the Duke of Bavaria, then in Liège, for at least a few months beginning in July 1587. He visited Venice, Rome, Magliano Capo di Sabina, and Aquila during the years 1585 to 1591 as well. Between 1591 and 1597 he was music director at the cathedral and seminary in Magliano Capo di Sabina. He disappears from the record after 1597, but a book of newly composed chansons by him, published in Antwerp that year, has suggested that he may have again returned to the land of his birth.

== Music ==
All of Rinaldo del Mel's surviving music is vocal, and it is both sacred and secular. He was a prolific composer, and wrote both motets and madrigals, as well as some forms that blended elements of the sacred and secular, such as a collection of "spiritual canzonets". His style shows the craftsmanship of an exceptional Netherlandish musical training, as well as the influence of Palestrina, who was probably his teacher, as claimed by Baini. Mel's sacred music, as would be expected of a composer of the Roman School, is more conservative stylistically than his secular music. Since his music is yet to appear in a modern edition it has not been fully evaluated by scholars.

Mel wrote several sets of cyclic madrigals, i.e. sets of madrigals which set successive stanzas of a long poem (Monteverdi's Sestina: Lagrime d'Amante al Sepolcro dell'Amata is probably the most famous example of a cyclic madrigal set). Setting cyclic madrigals was a hallmark of Roman School composers. Mel's settings show some progressive tendencies, such as an increasing melodic emphasis on the uppermost part, a feature which foreshadowed the polarization of soprano and bass parts that was a feature of the Baroque style several decades later. In addition, in his secular music he often employs harmonic progressions with root motions in fifths, another feature of the Baroque style to follow.

Another stylistic aspect of his madrigals is the prominent use of textural contrast, with chordal, syllabic passages alternating with passages in running thirds or sixths, or brief imitative sections. Long sections of purely contrapuntal writing are absent from his secular music, although, as in Palestrina, smooth counterpoint is the primary textural language of his sacred music.

== References and further reading ==
- Myers, Patricia Ann. L. Macy (ed.). Rinaldo del Mel. Grove Music Online. (subscription required)
- Gustave Reese, Music in the Renaissance. New York, W.W. Norton & Co., 1954. ISBN 0-393-09530-4
