= Nicolas Filleul de La Chesnaye =

French poet

Nicolas Filleul de La Chesnaye (1530 in Rouen – 1575) was a French poet. He was professor at the College of Harcourt, Eure where in 1563, he produced Achille (1563). His texts were used for the Ballet Comique de la Reine in 1581.
