= Jacques Patin =

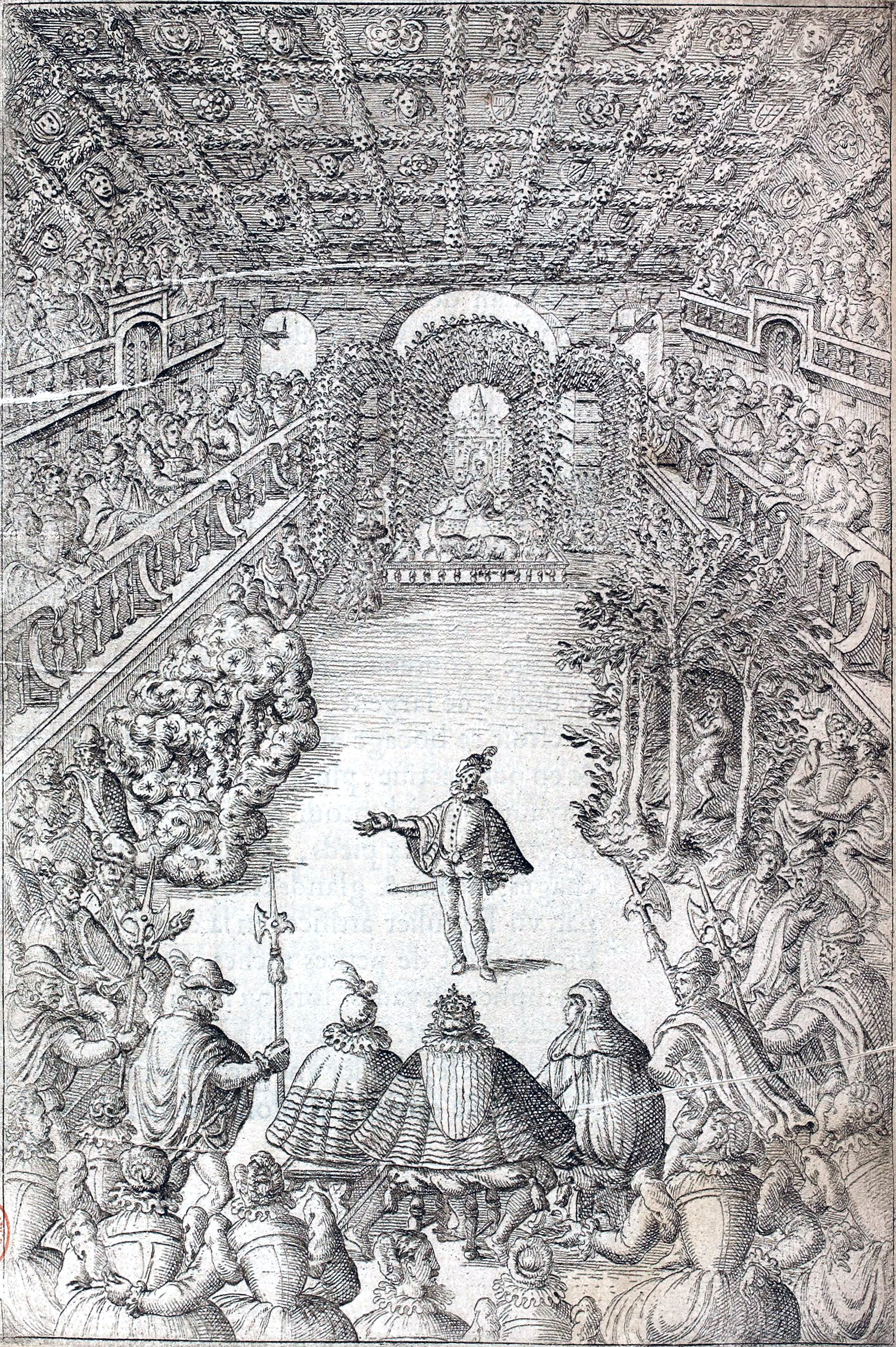
The Ballet Comique de la Reine, an illustration by Jacques Patin, published by Balthasar de Beaujoyeulx, 1582

Jacques Patin (died 28 May 1587) was a French painter, decorator, illustrator and engraver.

Although the date and place of Patin's birth are unknown, he was part of a family of artists that included his father and brothers.

He married Marguerite Pennichot in 1555, when he had already established a passable reputation.

In 1559 he was hired along with François Clouet and Guyon Ledoux to make armorial bearings for the funeral of Henry II, and in 1564, by Constable Anne de Montmorency to work at the Château d'Écouen, although there is no evidence that he was given any important projects there.

However, in 1567 he produced decorations for the Louvre under the supervision of Pierre Lescot and in 1570 was retained by the Grand Equerry Claude Gouffier to provide decorations for the Hôtel de Boissy.

In 1581 Patin designed the sets and costumes for the first ballet de cour, the Balet comique de la Royne, which was performed as part of the celebrations surrounding the marriage of the Duc de Joyeuse to Marguerite de Vaudémont, sister of Henry III's queen, Louise de Lorraine.

In 1582 Patin was officially made peintre du Roy (painter to the King), and, at the request of the queen, he drew and engraved 27 plates for the well-known book which was published by the creator of the ballet, Balthasar de Beaujoyeulx, to document the performance.

Patin probably died in Paris.
