= Severin Cornet =

Severin Cornet (c. 1530 – March 1582) was a Franco-Flemish singer, conductor and composer. He was born about 1530 in Valenciennes and studied music in Naples. After completing his education, he served for a while at Mechlin, took a position as singer in Antwerp, and later a position as music director for the Archduke in Innsbruck where he worked from 1572 until 1581. He composed a number of vocal works, including polyphonic madrigals and French chansons in the Italian style, and published a book of villaneche in Antwerp in 1563 with Genoese sponsorship. Cornet died in Antwerp.
