= Ballet de cour =

Type of dance in the 16th and 17th centuries

Ballet de cour ("court ballet") is the name given to ballets performed in the 16th and 17th centuries at courts.

The court ballet was a gathering of noblemen and women, as the cast and audience were largely supplied by the ruling class. The festivities, which were descendants of festivals, processions and mummeries dating back to the Middle Ages, looked more like a modern-day parade, than what people today would identify as a ballet performance. Where early court ballet differed from its predecessors, is that it was a secular, not religious happening. It was a carefully crafted mixture of art, socializing, and politics, with its primary objective being to exalt the State.

Because these celebrations occurred long before the proscenium stage had been invented, and were instead executed in large halls with audience members stacked up on three sides of the performance, early court ballet's choreography was constructed as a series of patterns and geometric shapes that were intended to be viewed from overhead. Once the performance was through, the audience was encouraged to join the dancers on the floor to participate in a "ball" which was designed to bring everyone in the hall into unanimity with the ideas expressed by the piece. As they developed through time, court ballets began to introduce comedy, went through a phase where they poked fun at manners and affectations of the time, and they moved into a phase where they became enamoured with pantomime. At the time of the court ballet's birth, a similar art form appeared in Italy called opera. The difference between the two crafts is that the developing phenomenon in Italy focused on the singing aspect of performance, whereas in France, movement was front and centre.

Early court ballets were influenced by the elaborate entertainments common in royal celebrations and aristocratic weddings of France and Italy. When the Florentine Catherine de’ Medici married the French King Henri II in 1533, French and Italian culture enmeshed as Catherine brought from her native Italy her penchant for theatrical and ceremonial events, including elegant court festivals. A more deliberate contribution the court ballet resulted from the Académie de Poésie et de Musique, founded in 1570 by the poet Jean-Antoine de Baif and the composer Thibault de Courville. The aim of the Academie was to revive the arts of the ancient world in order to harmonize dance, music, and language in a way that could result in a higher level of morality. It was from this marriage of traditional grand spectacle and conscious measured order that court ballets were born.

Jean-Baptiste Lully is considered the most important composer of music for ballet de cour and instrumental to the development of the form. During his employment by Louis XIV as director of the Académie Royale de Music, he worked with Pierre Beauchamp, Molière, Philippe Quinault and Mademoiselle De Lafontaine to develop ballet as an art form equal to that of the accompanying music.

== Notable works ==
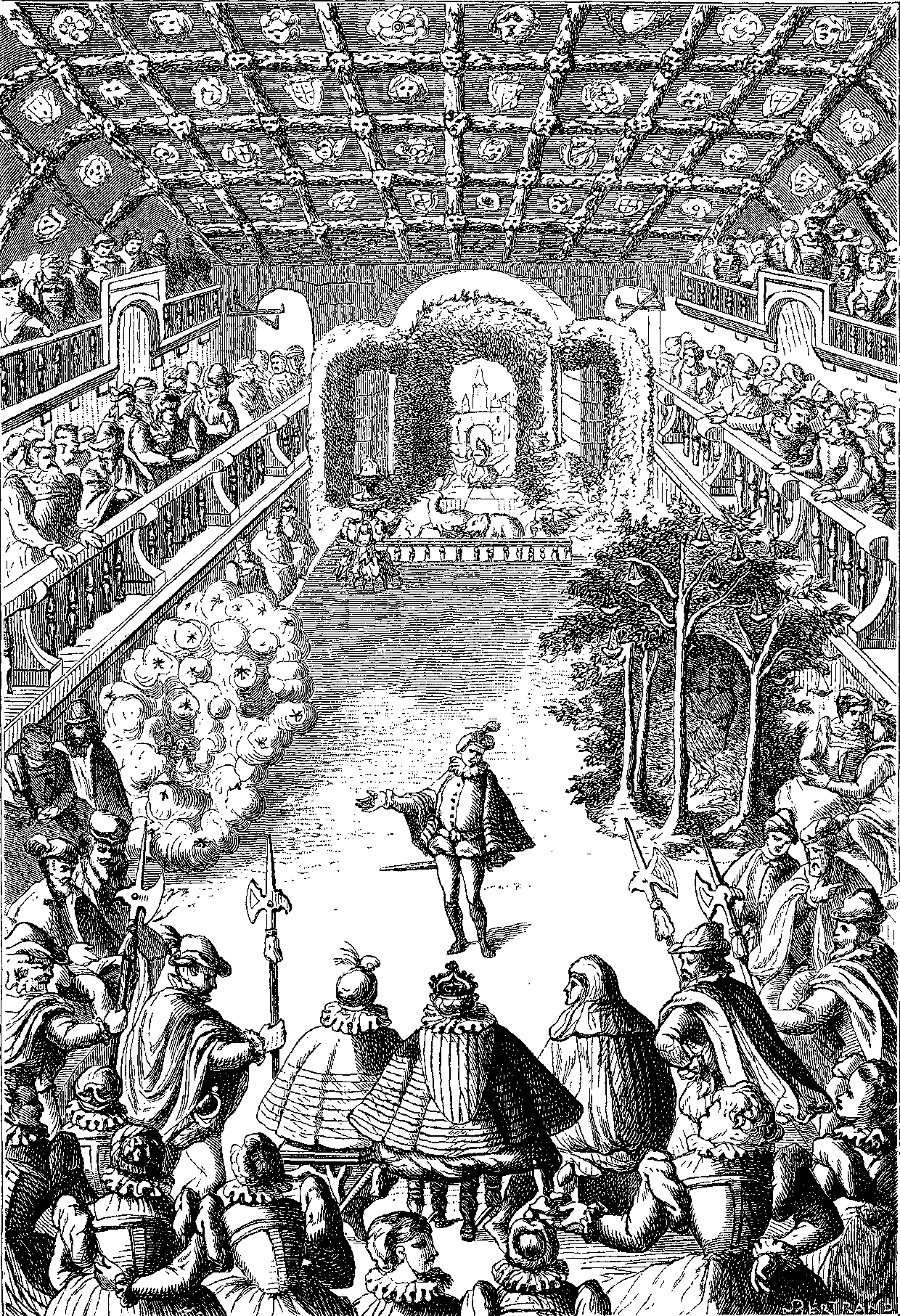
Engraving of the first scene of the Ballet Comique de la Reine, 1581

Ballet des Polonais was one of the first works to be recognized as a true court ballet. The spectacle was commissioned by Catherine de’ Medici in 1573 to celebrate the election of her second son, Henry of Anjou, as King of Poland. Performed at the Tuileries Palace and organized by the Italian dancing master, Balthasar de Beaujoyeulx, the hour-long ballet consisted of sixteen amateur French ladies representing the sixteen provinces of France. Describing it as the most beautiful ballet ever made on earth, the court observer Brantôme recounted that they "danced their ballet so curiously designed, with so many turns, swerves, and sinuosities, interlacings and minglings, confrontations and withdrawals, that [it was surprising that] no lady ever failed to be at her appointed turn or place." Although its combination of verse, song and dance had been used before, the intricate figure dancing involved in the Ballet des Polonais marked the beginning of the French style that would become the dominant continental school over the next century.

The first ballet de cour to fuse dance, poetry, music and design into a coherent dramatic statement was the Ballet Comique de la Reine, performed in 1581. As part of the wedding celebration for the queen's sister, Marguerite of Lorraine and the Duc de Joyeuse, the plot based on Ulysses’ encounter with Circe was symbolic of the country's desire to heal old wounds and restore peace after religious civil wars. Reaching new heights in scale and diversity, the lavish five-hour production included a three tiered fountain, palace, garden, townscape, and chariot-floats. As with Ballet de Polonais, Beaujoyeulx choreographed and oversaw the Ballet Comique, using form, geometry, measure, and discipline as a foundation that would later develop into the codified ballet technique.

An important step towards the ballet de cour in its final form was done during the reign of Louis XIII, with such rich and ravishing ballets de cour as La Délivrance de Renaud and the Ballet de la Merlaison. The ballets de cour developed into the comédie-ballet and then the opéra-ballet during the second half of the 17th century. This was a fully operatic form that included ballet as a prominent feature of the performance.

Beauchamp, superintendent of the ballet and director of the Académie Royale de Danse, codified the five positions based on the foundations set down by Thoinot Arbeau in his 1589 Orchésographie. Emphasising the technical aspects of dance, Beauchamp set out the first rules of ballet technique. The emphasis on turnout, light costumes, female dancers, and long dance sequences with light, flexible footwear, all first seen in L'Europe galante (1697), was a turning point in ballet practice that led to the pre romantic ballet era. Pierre Rameau expanded on Beauchamp's work in Le Maître à danser (1725), further detailing carriage of the body, steps and positions.

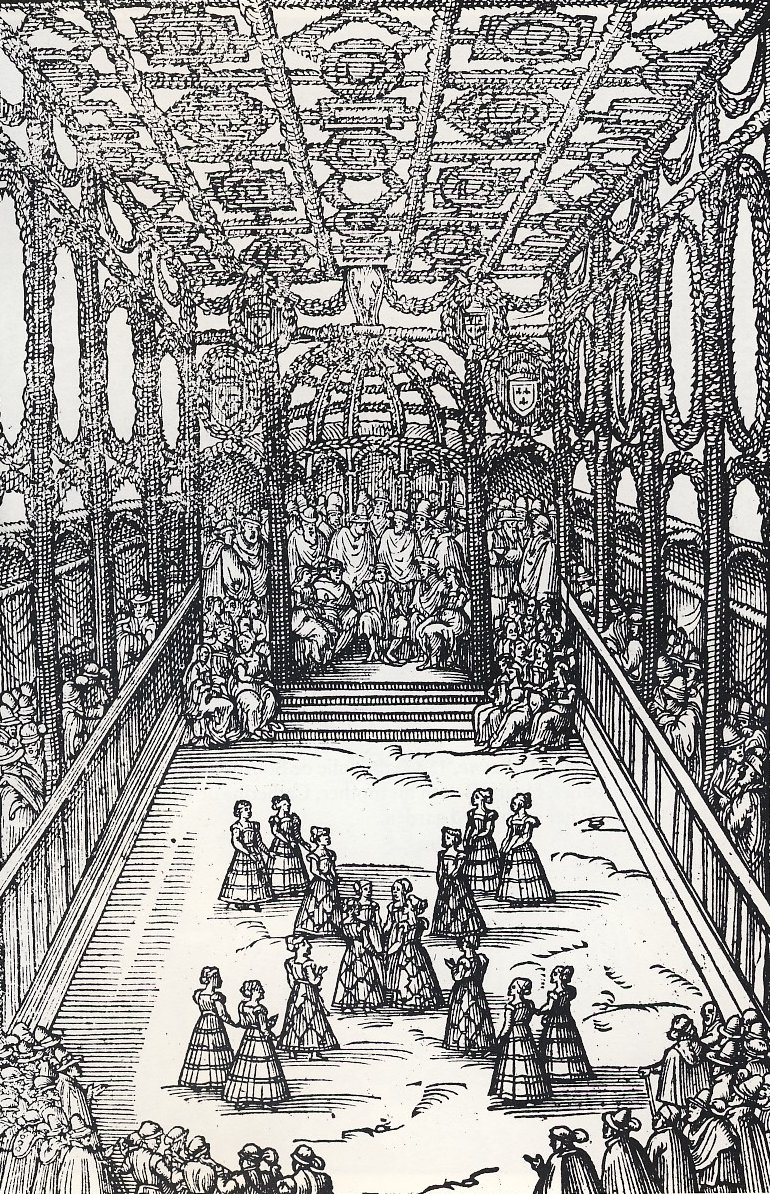
Woodcut of a court ballet performed at the Tuileries Palace, Paris, in 1573

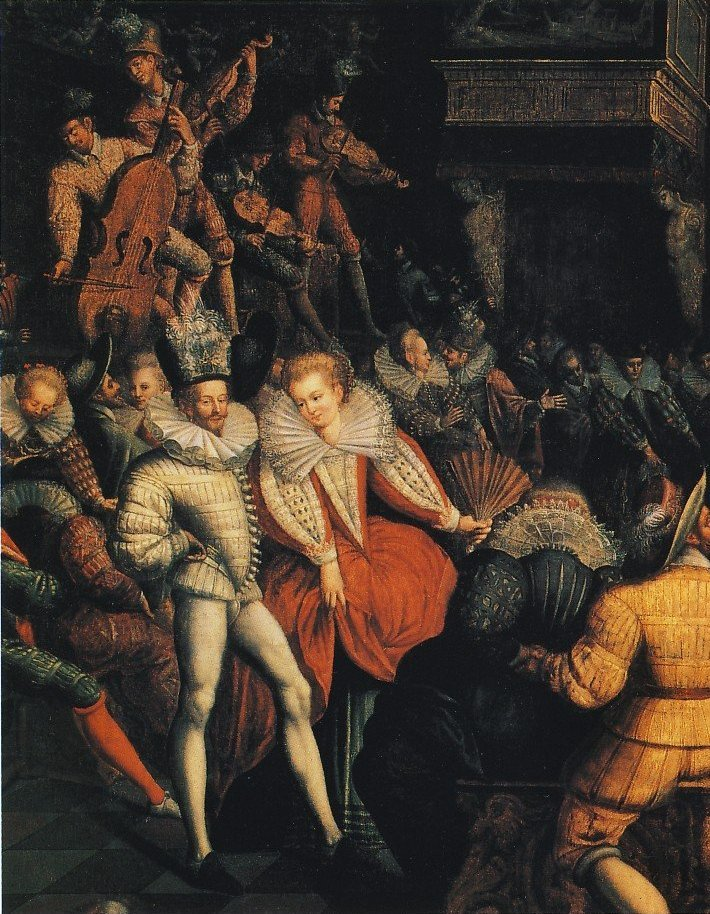
Ball at the Valois Court (around 1580)

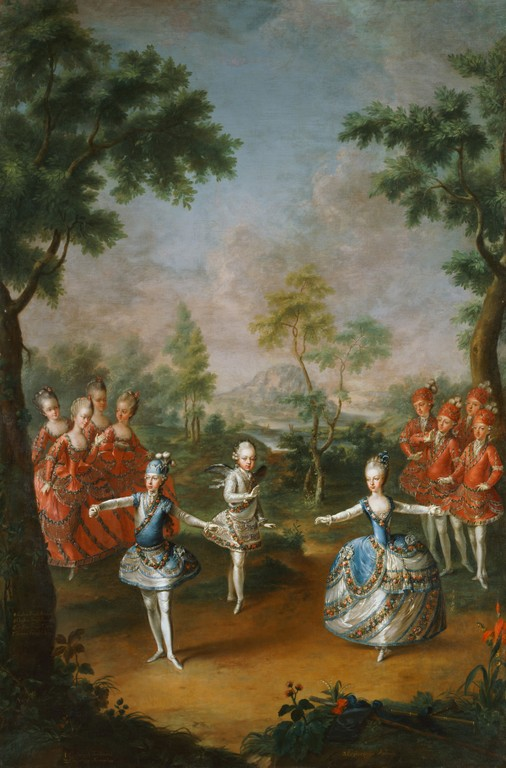
Representation of "the Triumph of love" given on the occasion of the marriage of Joseph II with Marie-Joséphine-Antoinette of Bavaria. (January 24, 1765) (Attributed to Georg Weikert)

== See also ==
- Catherine de' Medici's patronage of the arts
- History of ballet
- Timeline of ballet
