= Ballet Comique de la Reine =

1581 French court spectacle

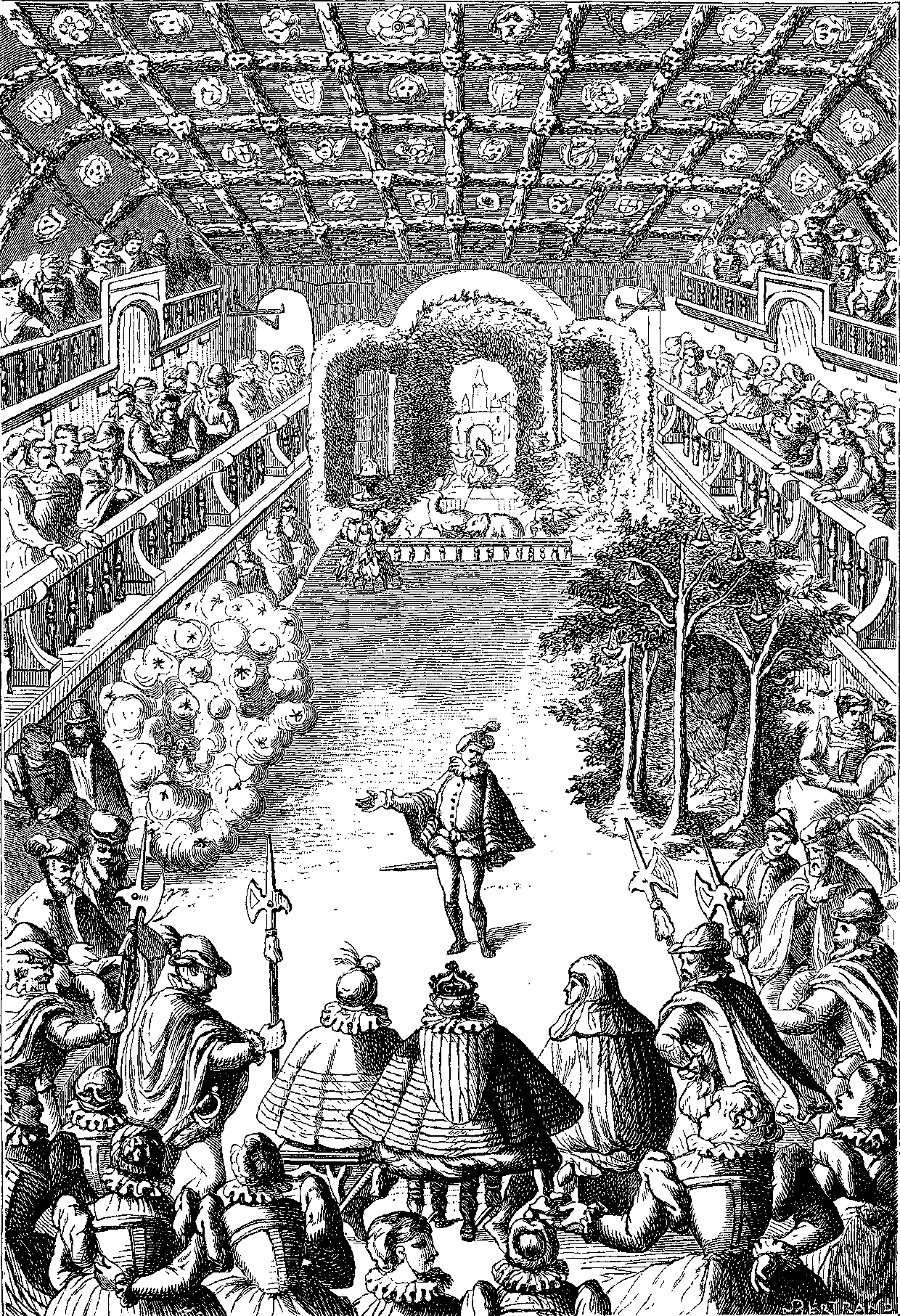
Engraving of the first scene of the Ballet Comique de la Reine. Click to enlarge.

The Ballet Comique de la Reine (at the time spelled Balet comique de la Royne) was an elaborate court spectacle performed on October 15, 1581, during the reign of Henry III of France, in the large hall of the Hôtel de Bourbon, adjacent to the Louvre Palace in Paris. It is often referred to as the first ballet de cour.

== Creation ==
The Ballet Comique de la Reine was created under the auspices of Henry III's mother, the dowager queen Catherine de' Medici, as part of the wedding celebrations for the Duke de Joyeuse and Queen Louise of Lorraine's sister, Marguerite de Vaudemont. The ballet was choreographed by Balthasar de Beaujoyeulx and was the first piece to combine poetry, music, design and dance according to the rules of Jean-Antoine de Baïf's Académie de Poésie et de Musique. The ballet was inspired by the enchantress, Circe, from Homer's Odyssey. The pricey production lasted five and half hours and the Queen and King both participated in the performance. The Queen, along with a group of lady court dancers arrived on a fountain that was three tiers high dressed as dryads. The dancers were entering and exiting from both sides of the set, which was unusual for previous court ballets. The ballet was also made in hopes of bringing resolution to the religious hardship that caused the French people to separate. Circe was a symbol of civil war, while the restoration of peace at the end of the ballet represented the country's hopes for the future.

Nicolas Filleul de La Chesnaye, the King's almoner, wrote the text, sets and costumes were designed by Jacques Patin. The music was provided by Jacques Salmon, maitre de la musique de la chambre de Roi, and a certain "Sieur de Beaulieu." This composer was identified as "Lambert de Beaulieu" by Fétis' in his Biographie universelle, following a probable error in a letter by Rudolph II, Holy Roman Emperor, but is today identified with the bass singer Girard de Beaulieu who with his wife, the Italian soprano Violante Doria themselves sung the airs to Circé.

== "Amaryllis" ==
The final nine measures of the first ballet, labelled "Le Son de la clochette auquel Circé sortit de son jardin" (the sound of the bell at which Circe leaves her garden), contain a tune that forms the basis of a nineteenth-century arrangement by Henri Ghys, which the latter mistakenly attributed to the air "Amaryllis" composed by Louis XIII. In Japan, this arrangement was given Japanese lyrics and introduced as "Amaryllis" on NHK's Minna no Uta series in 1968. The tune has since become well known as a French folk song there, and its melody can be heard today as a chime signaling the hour over the PA systems of some schools and rural municipalities.

Likely as a result of its popularity in Japan, it was selected as the tune that plays when a Zojirushi rice cooker finishes its job.

== See also ==
- Catherine de' Medici's court festivals
