= Balthasar de Beaujoyeulx =

Italian composer

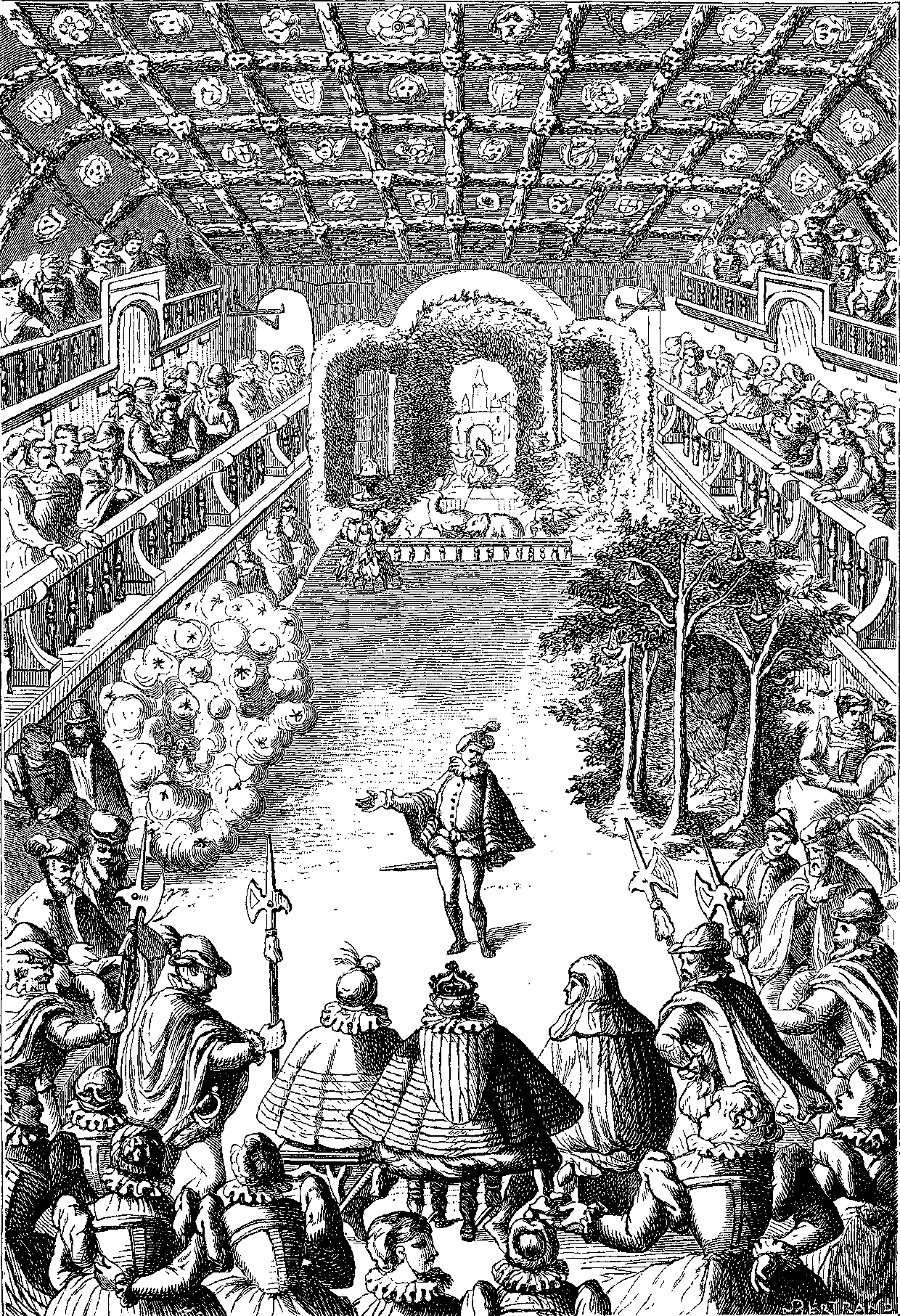
Engraving of the first scene of the Ballet Comique de la Reine. Click to enlarge.

Balthasar de Beaujoyeulx (modernized French: Balthazar de Beaujoyeux [baltazaʁ də boʒwajø]), originally Baldassare da (or di) Belgiojoso (modern Italian pronunciation: [baldasˈsaːre da/di beldʒoˈjoːzo]; died c. 1587 in Paris) was an Italian violinist, composer, and choreographer.

== Career ==
Beaujoyeulx moved to Paris in 1555, where he became a servant at the court of Catherine de' Medici. He tutored two of her sons and displayed a talent for arranging elaborate entertainments for the court. He participated in the masquerade Défense du paradis in 1572 and mounted the Ballet aux ambassadeurs polonais in 1573: one of the first works to be recognized as a true court ballet, staged to honor the Polish ambassadors who were visiting Paris upon the accession of Henry of Anjou to the throne of Poland.

On 24 September 1581 Henry III's favorite the Duke de Joyeuse married Marguerite de Lorraine (1564–1625), daughter of Nicolas, Duke of Mercœur and sister of the queen consort Louise of Lorraine. For the wedding celebrations Queen Louise devised and presented a five-and-a-half-hour dance extravaganza called the Ballet Comique de la Reine which cost over a million écu. She organized her own team of writers and musicians: the text was by the Sieur de la Chesnaye (Nicolas Filleul), the music by "Lambert de Beaulieu" (in fact Girard de Beaulieu), the sets by Jacques Patin, and Beaujoyeulx, who created the scenario, choreographed, stage managed, and directed. Since it incorporated a story line about the legend of the mythological enchantress Circe, it is generally regarded as the first ballet. The title page of his published account of the event states that he was employed as valet de chambre to both the King (Catherine's son, Henry III) and the Queen (queen consort Louise of Lorraine).

== See also ==
- Catherine de' Medici's court festivals
