= List of ballet premieres before 1800 =

Ballet premieres before 1800 span from Ballet Comique de la Reine in 1581 to Arden of Faversham in 1799. Entries are arranged below, chronologically, and give, where available, the choreographer, composer, venue or presentation, and premiere date.

== List ==
=== 1581 ===
title	choreographer	composer	venue or presentation	date
Ballet Comique de la Reine	Balthasar de Beaujoyeulx	Girard de Beaulieu	Hôtel de Bourbon	October 15

=== 1608 ===
title	choreographer	composer	venue or presentation	date
Il ballo delle ingrate		Claudio Monteverdi	Mantua	June 4

=== 1635 ===
title	choreographer	composer	venue or presentation	date
Ballet de la Merlaison		Louis XIII	Château de Chantilly	March 15

=== 1653 ===
title	choreographer	composer	venue or presentation	date
Ballet Royal de la Nuit		Jean de Cambefort, Jean-Baptiste Boësset, Michel Lambert	Salle du Petit-Bourbon	February 23

=== 1717 ===
title	choreographer	composer	venue or presentation	date
The Loves of Mars and Venus	John Weaver		Drury Lane Theatre	March 2

=== 1754 ===
title	choreographer	composer	venue or presentation	date
Les Fêtes Chinoises	Jean-Georges Noverre		Théâtre de l'Opéra-Comique	June

=== 1761 ===
title	choreographer	composer	venue or presentation	date
Don Juan	Gasparo Angiolini	Christoph Willibald von Gluck	Theater am Kärntnertor	October 17

=== 1778 ===
title	choreographer	composer	venue or presentation	date
Les petits riens	Jean-Georges Noverre	Wolfgang Amadeus Mozart	Academie Royale de Musique	June 11

=== 1789 ===
title	choreographer	composer	venue or presentation	date
La fille mal gardée	Jean Dauberval	pastiche of unknown origin	Grand Théâtre de Bordeaux	July 1

=== 1799 ===
title	choreographer	composer	venue or presentation	date
Arden of Faversham			Sadler's Wells	
