= Franz Hilverding =

Austrian choreographer and dancer (1710–1768)

Franz Anton Christoph Hilverding (1710–1768), also known as Hilferding, was an Austrian ballet choreographer and dancer.

== Career ==
For a time, Hilverding served as the director of the Imperial Theatre in Saint Petersburg, Russia. Hilverding, simultaneously as his contemporaries Jean Baptiste de Hesse, and own assistant Gaspare Angiolini, contributed to the development of the ballet d'action, for which Jean Georges Noverre would get lasting credit with the publication of his Letters on Dancing and Ballets. Ballets d'action emphasized a cohesive dramatic and expressive element to performances, with costumes, plot, and movement all serving the purpose of the story.

Hilverding studied in Paris from 1734 and 1736, and may have been inspired by the ballerina Marie Sallé, who was one of the first to explore this notion of cohesive dramatic ballets. He started creating dramatic ballets as court choreographer in Vienna in the 1740s, many using the stories of mythological lovers. Hilverding reworked Jean-Philippe Rameau's "Le turc généreux" ("The Generous Turk") (1758) from the opéra-ballet Les Indes galantes, which is immortalized in a print by Bernardo Bellotto entitled Le Turc Généreux. Ballet Pantomime executé à Vienne sur le théâtre de la cour, le 26 Avril 1758, in the British Museum in London.

Invited by tsarina Elizabeth of Russia in 1758, he became court choreographer in Saint Petersburg. He brought his dancers with him to Russia, and did much to progress the talent of the Russian dancers. He tried to use Russian themes in his ballets, and depicted Russia as the "Defender of Virtue" in his Virtue's Refuge.

Hilverding returned to Vienna in 1764 and staged Le Triomphe de l'Amour which starred Marie Antoinette and her brothers Ferdinand and Archduke Maximilian Francis of Austria.

== See also ==
- Culture in Vienna
- Dance in Austria
- Society and culture in Saint Petersburg
- List of choreographers
- List of dancers
- List of people from Saint Petersburg
- List of people from Vienna
- Russian ballet

== Sources ==
- Christopher Duggan. The Force of Destiny: A History of Italy Since 1796. (Boston: Houghton Mifflin Company, 2008) p. 5.
- Au, Susan. "Ballet and Modern Dance". London: Thames & Hudson Ltd, 1988, 2002.
