= 2 Rossi Street =

Building in Saint Petersburg, Russia

Coordinates: 59.930504°N 30.336015°E

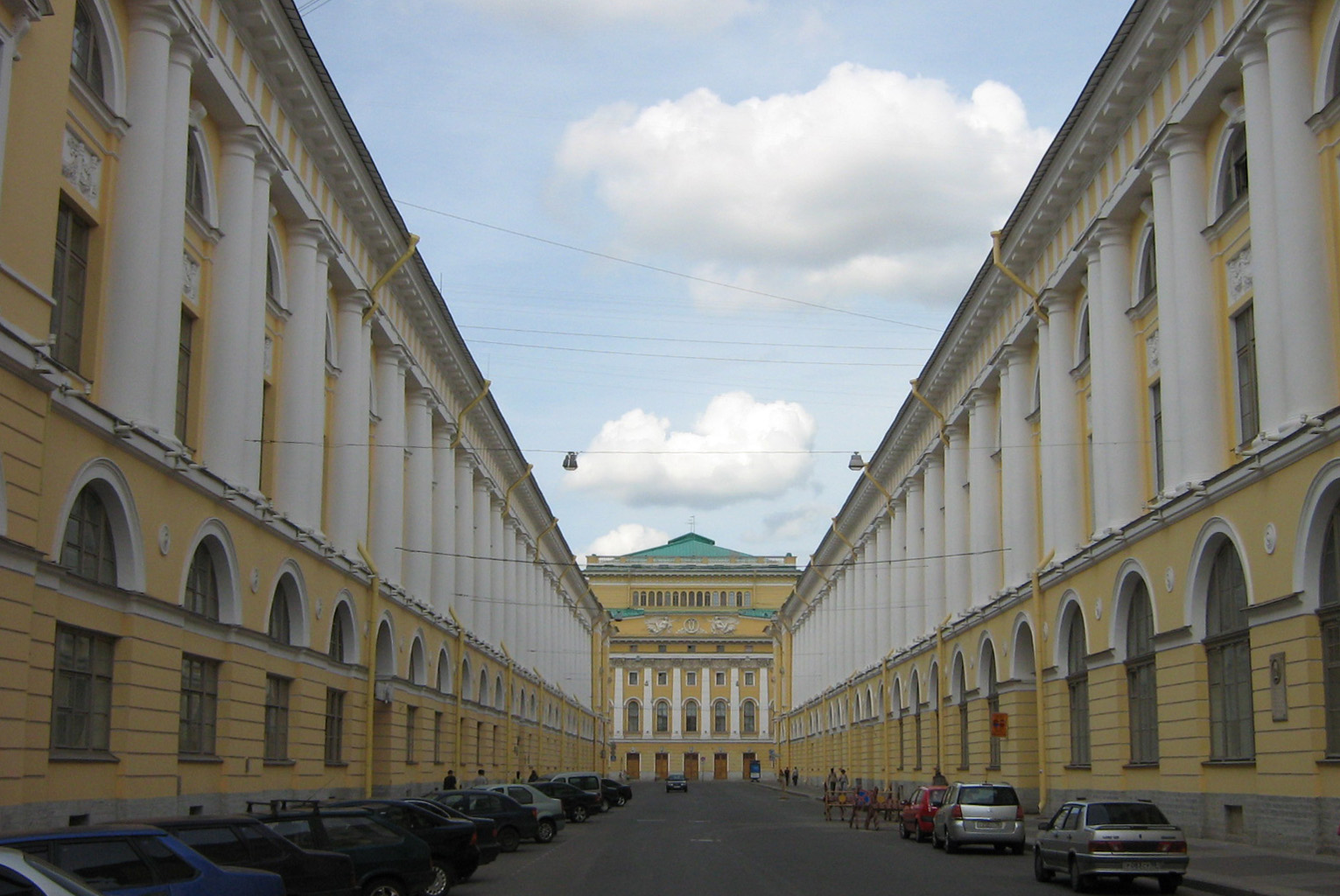
2 Rossi Street in 2008 (at right)

2 Architect Rossi Street (Russian: Улица Зодчего Росси, д. 2) is a building in St. Petersburg, Russia. It is located at the corner of Ostrovsky Square and Architect Rossi Street (also called simply as Rossi Street), which is named for the Italian architect Carlo Rossi who spent his working life in Russia.

== Description ==
The building, a prime architectural ornament of the city, follows the canons of classical antiquity: its height and width are identical (22 metres (72 ft)), and its length (220 metres (720 ft)) is exactly ten times its width. It is located in central St. Petersburg, the nearest metro station being Gostiny Dvor.

== History ==
In the middle of the 18th century, the site was occupied by gardens and outbuildings of the Vorontsov Palace and the Anichkov Palace.

At the end of the 18th century, the plot was sold and design work for the site was begun in 1816 by the Committee for Structures and Hydraulic Works. All five buildings on Rossi Street were designed by Carlo Rossi and built between 1828 and 1834. #2 was built in 1832. Since then the facade has remained essentially unchanged.

The building was initially a commercial enterprise under the aegis of the Ministry of the Imperial Court. The shops of the merchants Dejtera, Kolpakov, and Nizovskaya, and porcelain, glass, and paper manufactories were located on the ground floor. The upper two floors held apartments.

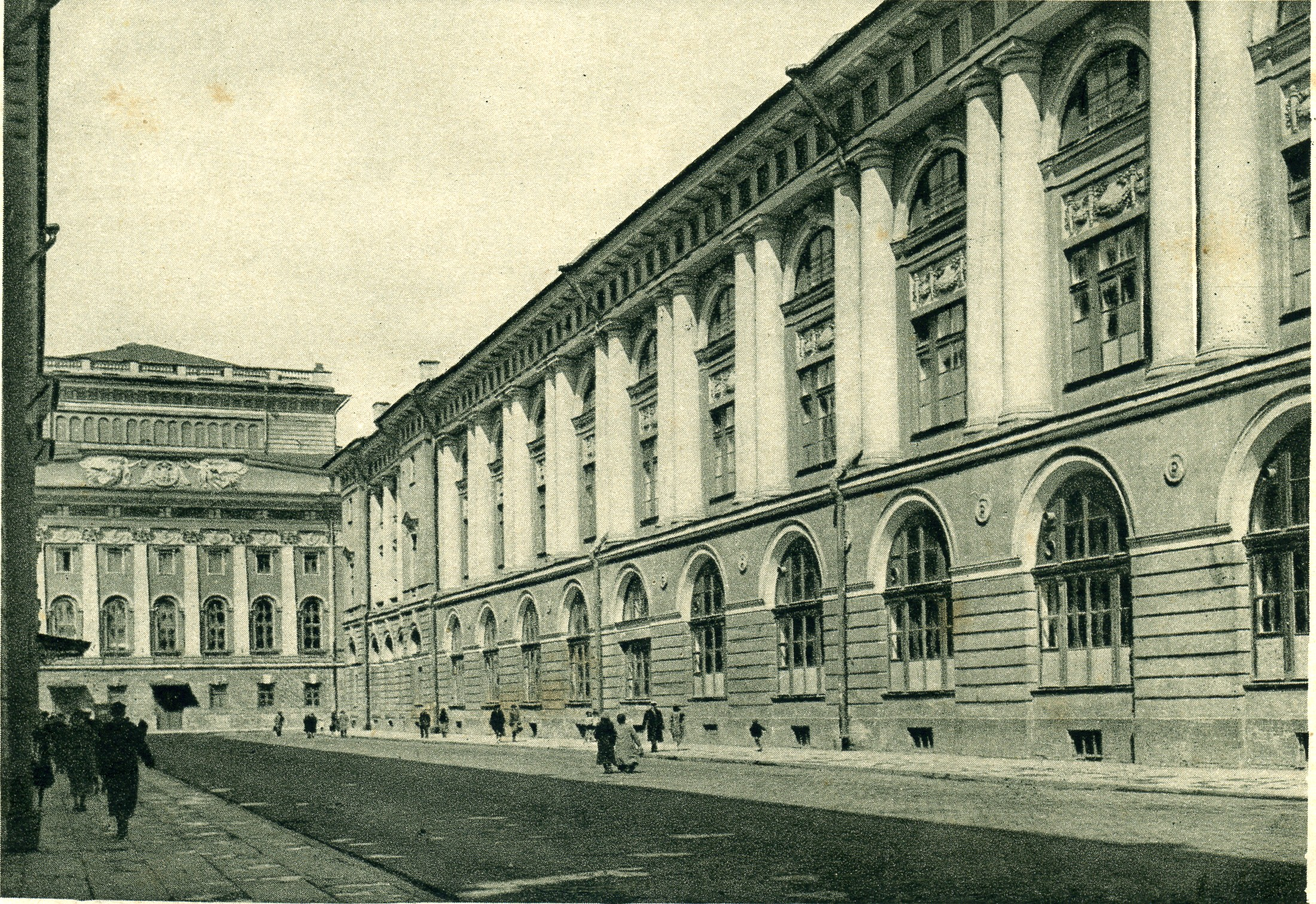
2 Rossi Street at the beginning of the 20th century

The merchants of the nearby Gostiny Dvor shopping arcade petitioned the Czar (Nicholas I) for protection from this competition, and in 1836 he ordered 2 Rossi Street transferred to the Directorate of Imperial Theaters.

After some changes to the facade and interior (arches converted to window niches, interior walls removed to create open halls) under the direction of the architect Alberto Cavos, the Imperial Ballet School (now the Vaganova Academy of Russian Ballet) took over the building. 2 Rossi Street became the center of theatrical life in St. Petersburg and many outstanding masters of the theater and ballet trained at the academy.

In 1890-1891 a building was constructed in the courtyard of 2 Rossi Street (designed by Alexander Geshvend) for storing scenery for the ballet troupe of the Imperial Directorate of Theaters.

During World War II, from 1941 to 1945 the building housed the headquarters of the Leningrad Military District, and a concrete bunker was added to the building.

In 1999 the Committee on Urban Planning & Architecture held a design competition for the improvement of Architect Rossi Street and Ostrovsky Square, and various improvements were made to the street, adding granite pavements and stone ramps.

At the end of 2007 an overhaul of the building was announced, including the addition of penthouse apartments. Renovation began in August 2009 and was scheduled to have been completed by December 2010.

Russian: К 2006 году здание пришло в аварийное состояние, что стало угрожать безопасности учащихся, поэтому было принято решение ремонтировать Вагановское училище за счет городских средств. На сегодня значительная часть помещений уже отреставрирована, работы ведутся на хорошем уровне. К тому же, за счет переоборудования удалось увеличить площадь здания на 3200 квадратных метров, что позволит решить проблему нехватки помещений для занятий
English: By 2006 this building had declined to a parlous state that began to threaten the safety of the pupils, so it was decided to renovate the Vaganova Ballet Academy building using municipal funds. Now the building has been largely restored to a satisfactory state. The project has also allowed us to increase the floor area by 3,200 square metres (34,000 sq ft), providing more usable space.

— Valentina Matviyenko, Governor of Saint Petersburg.

== Memorials ==
The building features memorials to some of the artists associated with 2 Rossi Street.

=== Ulanova monument ===
The monument to Galina Ulanova, created by the sculptor Elena Janson-Manizer in 1936, has a rich history.

It was first placed on Yelagin Island in Kirov Park. It remained there until the middle 1980s, by which time it had deteriorated considerably, at which time it was dismantled and placed in storage at the Yelagin Palace.

During preparation for the celebrations of the 300th anniversary of Saint Petersburg, employees of the Vaganova Ballet Academy were alerted to the existence of the sculpture in the museum's storerooms. Under the initiative of the Rector of the Academy L. N. Nadirov, the academy accepted responsibility for the sculpture and restored it at its own expense.

The sculpture was installed in the courtyard and unveiled on January 8, 2004, the 94th anniversary of the great ballerina's birth. The sculpture is 233 centimetres (7.64 ft) x 107 centimetres (3.51 ft) x 65 centimetres (2.13 ft), the pedestal height is 140 centimetres (4.6 ft).

=== Memorial plaques ===
English translation	Author information	Place	Russian
Marius Ivanovich Petipa
Here, in the rehearsal halls of the St. Petersburg Imperial Ballet and Theater School, the great Russian choreographer, performer, and teacher Marius Ivanovich Petipa was active from 1847 through 1905.	1993, designer D. L. Kalinin, electroplate	In the building	Здесь, в репетиционных залах Санкт-Петербургской Императорской балетной труппы и театрального училища, с 1847 г. по 1905 г. проходила творческая деятельность Мариуса Ивановича Петипа, великого русского балетмейстера, артиста, педагога
Vera Michurina-Samoilova
People's Artist of the USSR Vera Arkadyevna Michurina-Samoilov lived and worked in this house from 1917, and died here in 1948.	1950, designer N. I. Smirnov, sculptor N. V. Dydykin, marble	On the building facade	В этом доме с 1917 г. жила, работала и в 1948 г. скончалась народная артистка СССР Вера Аркадьевна Мичурина-Самойлова
