= Vaganova Academy of Russian Ballet =

Classical ballet school in Russia

Vaganova Academy of Russian Ballet (name since 1957)
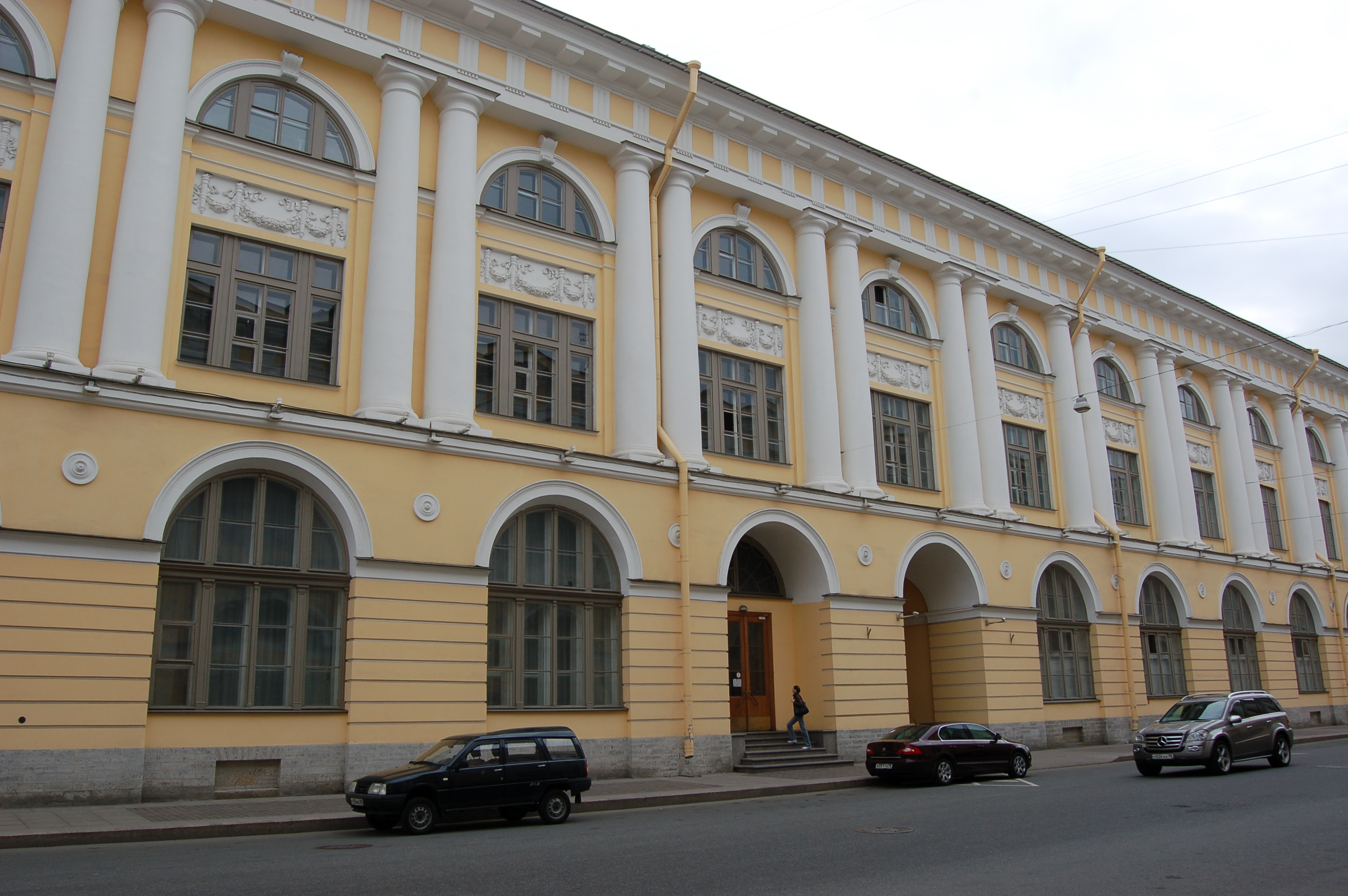
- (early 21st century)

Location
- Saint Petersburg, Russia; 59.9303°N 30.3358°E

Information
- Former names: Imperial Theaatrical School; Imperial Ballet School; Leningrad State Choreographic Institute
- Type: Ballet school
- Established: May 4, 1738 (288 years ago) (as the Imperial Theatrical School)
- Enrollment: 300+
- Campus type: Urban
- Website: vaganovaacademy.ru

The Vaganova Academy of Russian Ballet is a school of classical ballet in Saint Petersburg, Russia.

Established in 1738 during the reign of Empress Anna, the academy was known as the Imperial Ballet School until the Soviet era, when, after a brief hiatus, the school was re-established as the Leningrad State Choreographic Institute. In 1957, the school was renamed in honor of the pedagogue Agrippina Vaganova, who cultivated the method of classical ballet training that has been taught there since the late 1920s. Many of the world's leading ballet schools have adopted elements of the Vaganova method into their own training.

The Vaganova Academy is the associate school of the Mariinsky Ballet, one of the world's leading ballet companies. Students of the school have found employment with ballet and contemporary companies worldwide, including the Bolshoi Ballet, The Royal Ballet, American Ballet Theatre and the Mikhailovsky Ballet.

== History ==
The school was established as the Imperial Theatrical School by decree of the Empress Anna on 4 May 1738 with the French ballet master Jean-Baptiste Landé as its director. The first classes occupied empty rooms in the Winter Palace in Saint Petersburg and the first students were twelve boys and twelve girls.

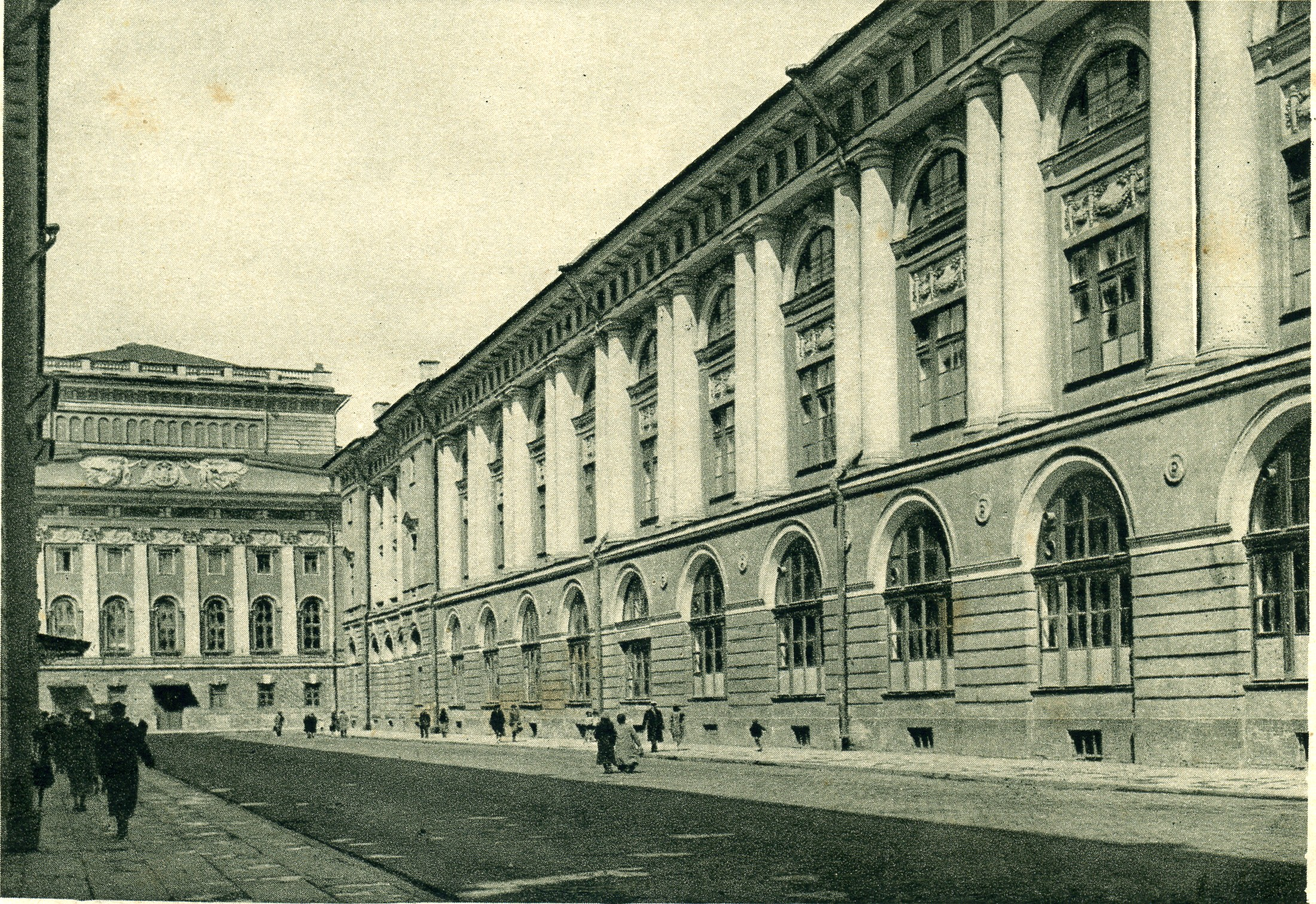
2 Rossi Street at the beginning of the 20th century

Nearly all the early teachers at the school were from Western Europe, including Franz Hilferding and Giovanni Canzianni. The first Russian teacher to join the school was Ivan Valberg. After the spread of ballet in Europe, the development of the school was influenced by a number of other teachers and methods, including Christian Johannson, a student of August Bournonville, and the Italian methods of Enrico Cecchetti, Pierina Legnani and Carlotta Brianza. Other renowned 19th-century dancers and ballet masters who taught at and were influential in the development in the school include Charles Didelot, Jules Perrot, Arthur Saint-Léon, Lev Ivanov, Marius Petipa and Mikhail Fokine.

Since 1836, the school has been situated at 2 Rossi Street in Saint Petersburg (known as Leningrad after 1924 until the collapse of the Soviet Union). The Imperial Ballet School was dissolved by the new Soviet government, but later re-established on the same site as the Leningrad State Choreographic School. The Imperial Russian Ballet was also dissolved and re-established as the Soviet Ballet. The company was later renamed the Kirov Ballet following the assassination of Sergey Kirov in 1934. Despite in 1992 being given the current name Mariinsky Ballet, the company is still commonly known as the Kirov Ballet.

== Vaganova ==
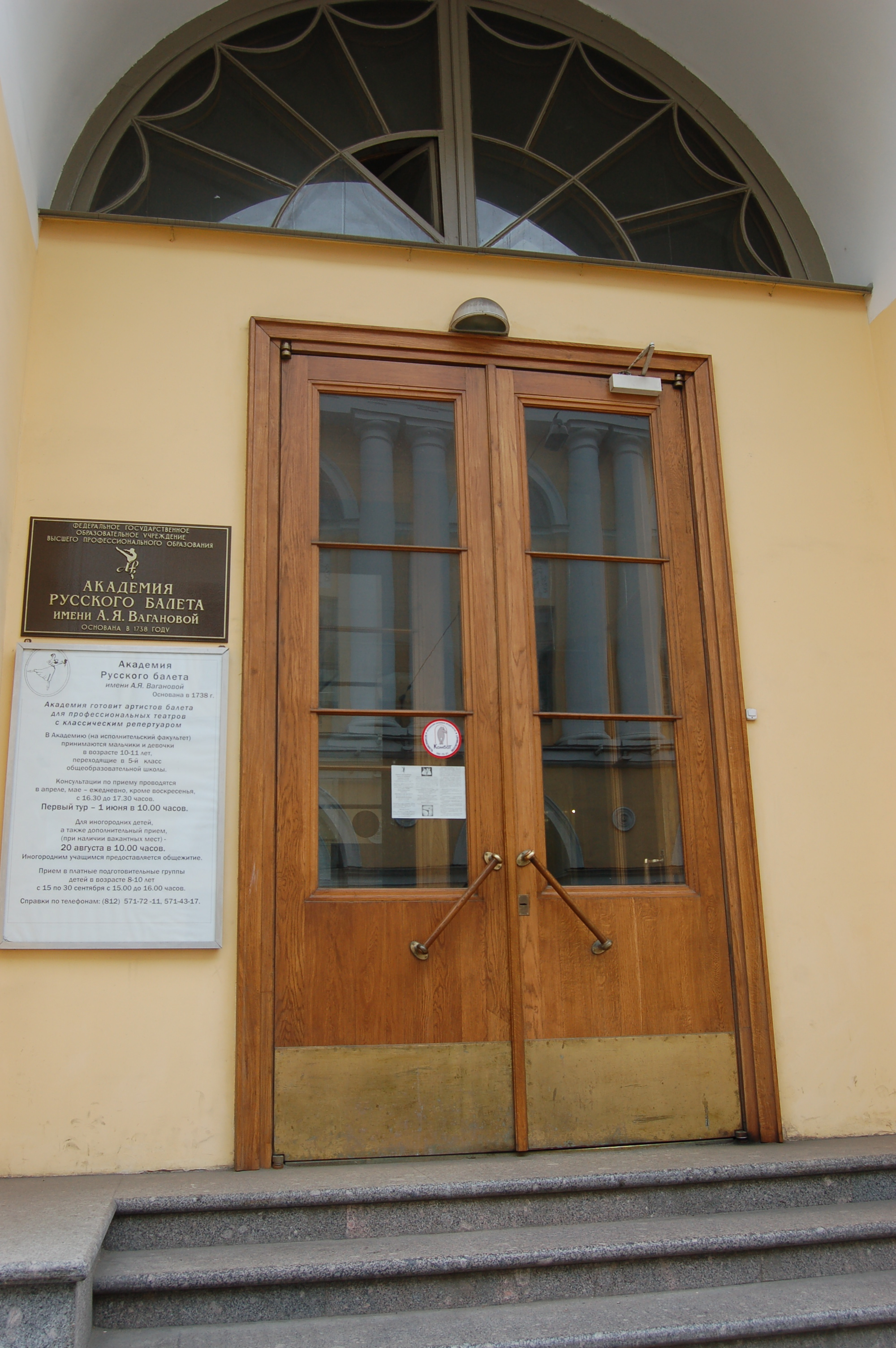
The Vaganova Academy of Russian Ballet's main entrance (2009)

Agrippina Vaganova brought developments in modern Russian ballet. She graduated from the Imperial Ballet School in 1897 and danced with the Imperial Ballet, retiring from the stage early to pursue her teaching career following the 1917 October Revolution. As the Soviet government had not yet re-established the school, Vaganova began her teaching career at the privately owned School of Russian Ballet, eventually joining the new Leningrad State Choreographic School in 1920. Vaganova is noted for writing The Principles of Classical Dance, which outlines the training system she created. There are a number of variations in the name of the school, but the official title in current use in the English-speaking world is Vaganova Ballet Academy.

== Today ==
=== Overview ===
The Vaganova Ballet Academy, which some consider the source of modern ballet, is now over 275 years old. The academy has over 300 students; its rector is Nikolay Tsiskaridze and ita artistic director is Zhanna Ayupova.

=== Training ===
All students at the school begin by studying a program of dance training, secondary-school-level education, French language and piano lessons. As they progress through the school, the program becomes more intensive, with new subjects being added to the curriculum as the students become more advanced. Students are evaluated at the end of each academic year and a decision made as to whether they will advance to the higher grades which have progressively fewer openings.

== See also ==
- Category:Vaganova Academy of Russian Ballet alumni
- Education in Saint Petersburg
- Lists of schools
- Society and culture in Saint Petersburg
