= Jean-Joseph Rodolphe =

French horn player

Jean-Joseph Rodolphe (14 October 1730 – 12 August 1812) was a French horn player, violinist and composer.

== Life ==
Born in Strasbourg, Rodolphe was a pupil of Jean-Marie Leclair in Paris. He travelled to Parma in 1754 and to Stuttgart in 1761, where he played in the ducal court orchestra and studied with Niccolò Jommelli There he provided the music for Jean-Georges Noverre's ballet of Jason et Médée (premiere, 11 February 1763). By 1767 he was again in Paris, where he composed music for the stage, both ballets and operas, and horn music and taught.

From 1798 he was a professor at the Paris Conservatory. He popularized the horn as a solo instrument and was probably the first in Paris to use the technique of hand-stopping, by which a natural horn can be made to produce notes outside of its normal harmonic series. None of his music survives in the modern concert repertory.

He died in Paris.
