= Ballet d'action =

Hybrid genre of expressive and symbolic ballet that emerged during the 18th century

Ballet d'action is a hybrid genre of expressive and symbolic ballet that emerged during the 18th century. One of its chief aims was to liberate the conveyance of a story via spoken or sung words, relying simply on quality of movement to communicate actions, motives, and emotions. The expression of dancers was highlighted in many of the influential works as a vital aspect of the ballet d'action. To become an embodiment of emotion or passion through free expression, movement, and realistic choreography was one chief aim of this dance. Thus, the mimetic aspect of dance was used to convey what the lack of dialogue could not. Certainly, there may have been codified gestures; however, a main tenant of the ballet d'action was to free dance from unrealistic symbolism, so this remains an elusive question. Often, props and costume object were involved in the performance to help clarify character interaction and passions. An example would be the scarf from La Fille mal gardée, which represents the love of the male character and which the female character accepts after a coy moment. Props were thus used in harmony with dancer movement and expression. Programs for plays were also a place to explain the onstage action; however, overt clarifications were sometimes criticized for sullying the art of the ballet d'action.

Although the French choreographer Jean-Georges Noverre is often credited with the original ideas and definitions of what he termed "ballet en action", there were various other influences that contributed to the development of the genre. While Noverre's 'Letter 1' provides a clear outline of his ideas of ballet d'action, he was not the first nor the last to develop a theory of a ballet in action.

== Influencers ==
- In the early 18th century, the grotesque dance was influential in that it inspired two very different outcomes: Gennaro Magri's style of rigid, mechanized dancing and body position, and John Weaver's idea of passion and expression in dance. In his "Essay Towards a History of Modern Dancing", Weaver writes that "modern dancing" (or the grotesque character) should include the mimetic qualities in harmony with choreography and movement. He encourages the idea that an audience should be able to recognize the emotions of a character and the story-line of a dance simply through the expression and movements of the dancer.
- Marie Salle was not only a major influence on the development of ballet d'action, but an exemplary dancer, choreographer, and teacher in her own right. Her background as a carnival performer most likely contributed to her fame as a skilled mime. An evolution from the grotesque dance into the pantomime ballet created the stories by action that so inspired Noverre. As her student, he was exposed to her modern, expressive dancing and the conveyance of passions onstage. She danced with costume innovations that are clearly the parent of the ballet d'action; instead of heavy, cumbersome costumes and masks, she performed in simple outfits with her hair and face free to the audience. Her dance partners, too, were affected by her expressive dances, as written by none other than Noverre. Her free and passionate mimetic theatrical dances clearly inspired, at least in part, Noverre's treatise. One could say that they were the first instances of the 'classic' ballet d'action.
- Jean-Georges Noverre's name has nothing to do with the idea of "Ballet d'action". He wrote his fictional Lettres sur la danse, et sur les ballets (Letters about the dance, and about ballets) already 1760 in Lyon/France in French, which was a widely published and highly popular dance manual then in France, Germany and Austria. Dissatisfied with the outdated ideals of ballet, Noverre called for severe reforms to the art form. These reforms presented the concept of a ballet en action (ballet in motion), which has a double-sense regarding his reform ideas for the ballet. Unfortunately the first English translator of Noverre in 1782 used the term "ballet d'action" in the English edition of Noverre's Lettres, and named it as the untranslated French term of Noverre, what is not correct, and still leads to some misunderstanding.

Noverre's manifesto explored the following:

- Logical plots: No more illogical or insane plots. Ballets should be rationally constructed. Stage action should be coherent, with each scene consistent in tone. Variety and contrast can be displayed throughout the ballet as a whole.
- Truth over nature: Noverre did away with the symbolism and abstractions present in the court ballet. Mythological figures could only be used in ballets if motivated by human emotions.
- No to the use of masks: Noverre did away with the use of masks. The dancer's face should be seen. It is expressive and reinforces the emotion they are trying to communicate with their audience.
- Costume Reform: Dancers should be dressed in light fabrics that show off their figures and allow for mobility. No more cumbersome costumes such as panniers or tonnelets. Costumes should be timely and represent the character the dancer is portraying.
- Artistic Collaboration: Noverre called for better communication between artistic collaborators. It had been common practice (until this point) for the choreographer, composer, the designers, and the machinists to work independently until late in the production process. Noverre felt that a more cohesive creative process was integral to the success of a ballet.
- Noverre was also a proponent of education. He recommended that choreographers educate themselves in additional subjects to better assist in their ability to create truthful ballets. For example, a choreographer should study painting so he can compose stage pictures (formations) as a painter would. He should also observe people in all walks of life, so he can apply realistic and appropriate gestures to the characters created in ballets.
- Other contributors include the choreographers Jean-Baptiste de Hesse (1705–1779) and Franz Anton Hilverding (1710–1768), as well as critic Gasparo Angiolini (1731–1803) and Louis de Cahusac (1700–1759), a French librettist and dance historian.
