= Ludwigsburg porcelain =

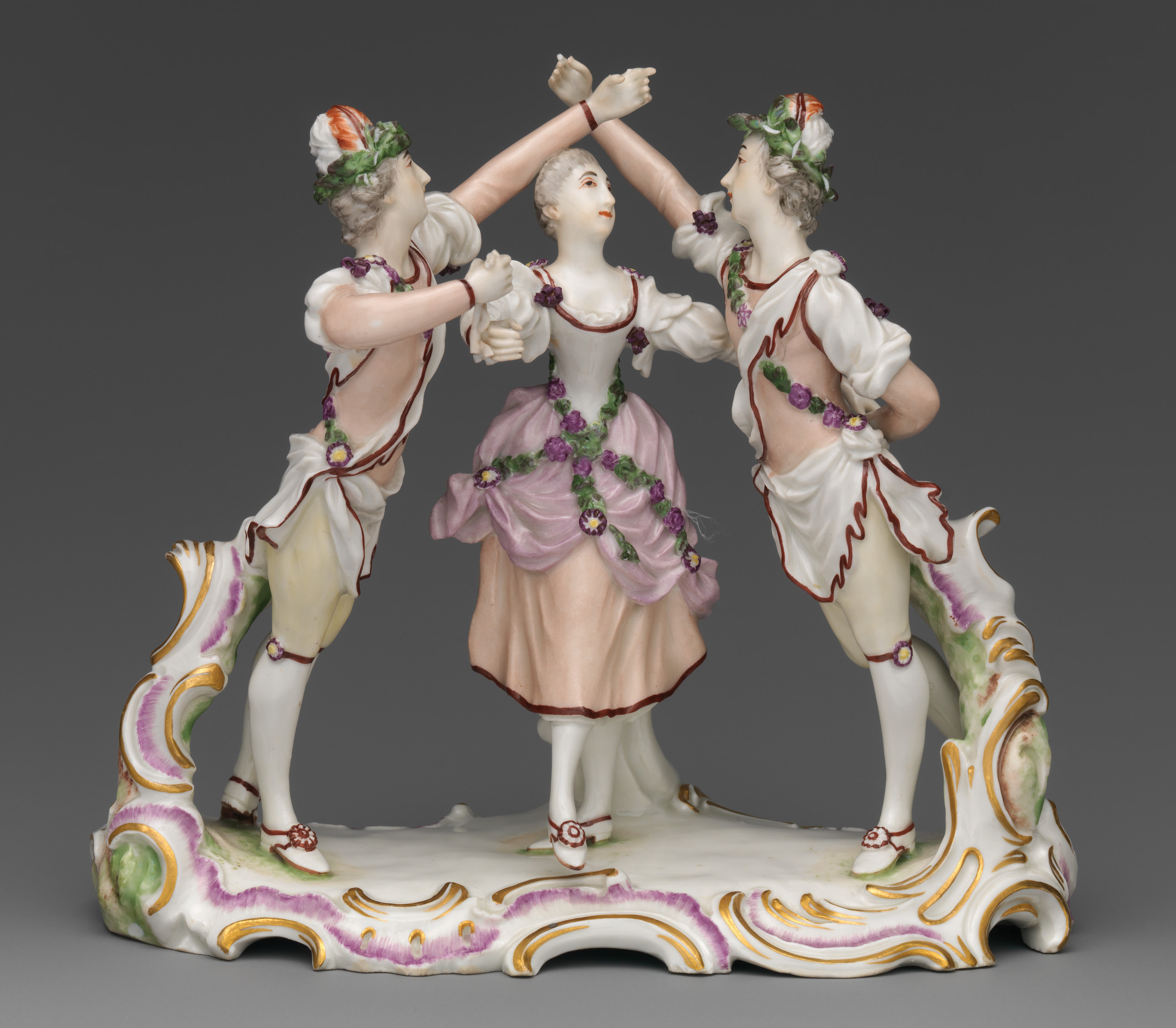
Three dancers, c. 1763, in the lighter ballet costumes pioneered by the ballet master Jean-Georges Noverre.

Ludwigsburg porcelain is porcelain made at the Ludwigsburg Porcelain Manufactory founded by Charles Eugene, Duke of Württemberg, on 5 April 1758 by decree as the Herzoglich-ächte Porcelaine-Fabrique. It operated from the grounds of the Baroque Ludwigsburg Palace. After a first two decades that were artistically, but not financially, successful, the factory went into a slow decline and was closed in 1824. Much later a series of other companies used the Ludwigsburg name, but the last production was in 2010.

A similar range of wares was made to other German factories. Tableware was most often painted with European flowers, and Ludwigsburg made little in chinoiserie styles, already somewhat past their most fashionable. Figures were a relatively large proportion of production compared to other German factories, and included series of court ballet dancers, peasants, and musicians. There were some (more than usually) miniature groups on bases, with figures some three inches high, including ones showing the annual "Venetian fair" held at the court, and some groups satirizing court fashions. Beyer produced more monumental figures in an early Neoclassical style, including a set of musicians.

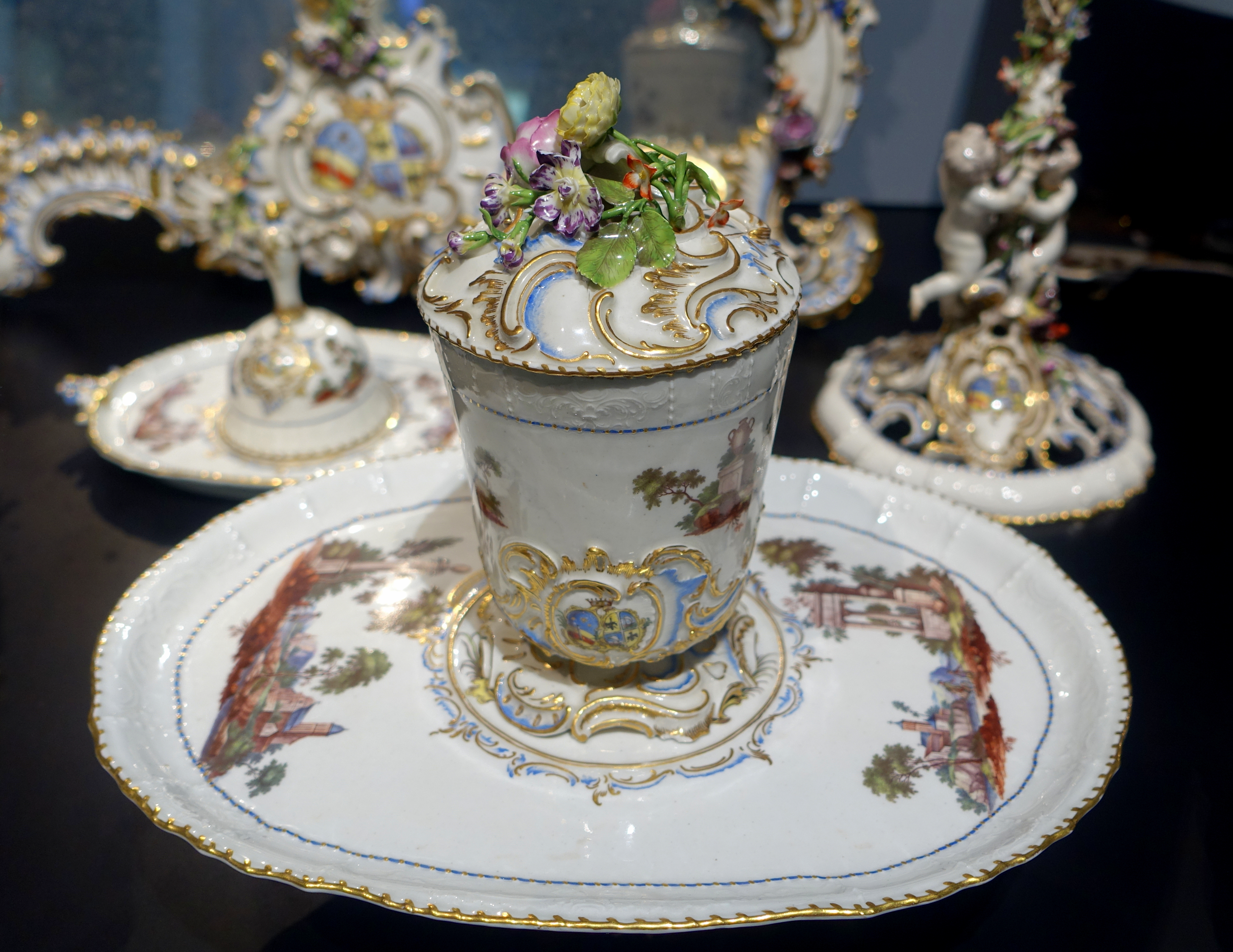
Part of a service with the Martinelli-Giovanelli arms, by Gottlieb Friedrich Riedel, 1762–1763

The original manufactory became famous for its figurines, which are interesting because they very likely were modelled directly on the costumes used in the court ballet, another enthusiasm of Duke Charles Eugene. Between 1760 and 1766 he had managed to entice to Stuttgart the innovative choreographer and ballet master Jean-Georges Noverre, then out of favour in Paris. One of Noverre's innovations was using lighter costumes allowing the dancer to move freely, shown in some of the figure groups, as the one illustrated here, but not all.

The 18th-century factory mark was two "C"s interlocked in blue, with one reversed, with or without a ducal coronet above.

== History ==
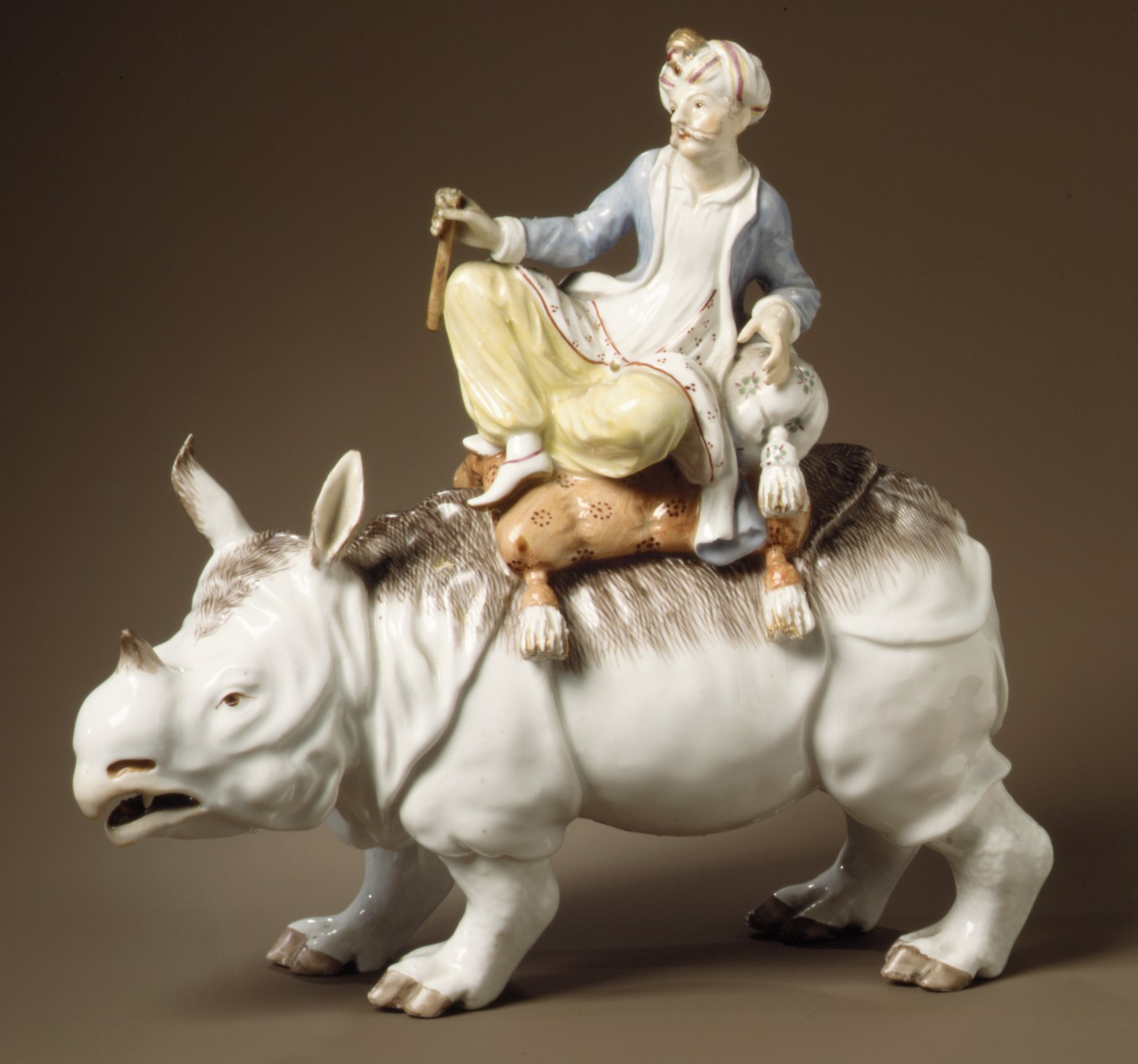
Turk on a rhinoceros, c. 1755–1760

Until the 18th century, porcelain had to be imported into Europe from East Asia and was thus rare on the continent. The first European hard-paste porcelain factory was that making Meissen porcelain from 1710, followed by Vienna porcelain in 1718, the Höchst Porcelain Manufactory in 1746, Fürstenberg and Nymphenburg in 1747, Berlin in 1751, and then the Frankenthal factory in 1755. France and England at the same time saw the foundations of the workshops at Chantilly in 1725, the Vincennes factory in 1738, and London's Chelsea porcelain factory in 1743.

Attempts at producing porcelain in Ludwigsburg had been made since 1724 under Eberhard Louis, Duke of Württemberg. Ludwigsburg was a poor site for a porcelain manufactory, as it was not located near abundant woodland or clay deposits. Transportation of materials was difficult and therefore expensive. From 1751 on, Charles Eugene also attempted to make porcelain at Ludwigsburg but was unsuccessful. Then in January 1759, he hired Joseph Jakob Ringler, who had worked at Vienna, Höchst, Strasbourg, Frankenthal, and Nymphenburg, to direct Ludwigsburg's porcelain factory. Within months, Ringler was in charge of 35 employees. Among them was Gottlieb Friedrich Riedel, a modeller who had worked at Meissen, Frankenthal, and Höchst, and Johann Wilhelm Beyer, better known for his later work as a sculptor in Vienna.

Although the porcelain manufactory was not profitable and relied on Charles Eugene's patronage, by the early 1760s it produced a large variety of high quality porcelain wares based on the duke's tastes. Most of the dancer figurines were modelled by Joseph Nees, from 1760 to 1763, and are notable for their capturing the movement of a dance. Its most successful period was between about 1764 and 1775, having its best success in Holland. By the 1790s the factory was seriously in decline. After the dukes became Kings of Württemberg on the dissolution of the Holy Roman Empire in 1806, the official name of the factory changed to Herzoglich-Königliche Porzellan-Manufaktur Ludwigsburg ("Ducal/Royal porcelain factory Ludwigsburg"). It had never been profitable, and later rulers lost interest and resented the expense until it was closed in 1824, after attempts to find a buyer had failed. The moulds, recipes, and books were archived when the manufactory closed. The period was a difficult one financially for many German factories.

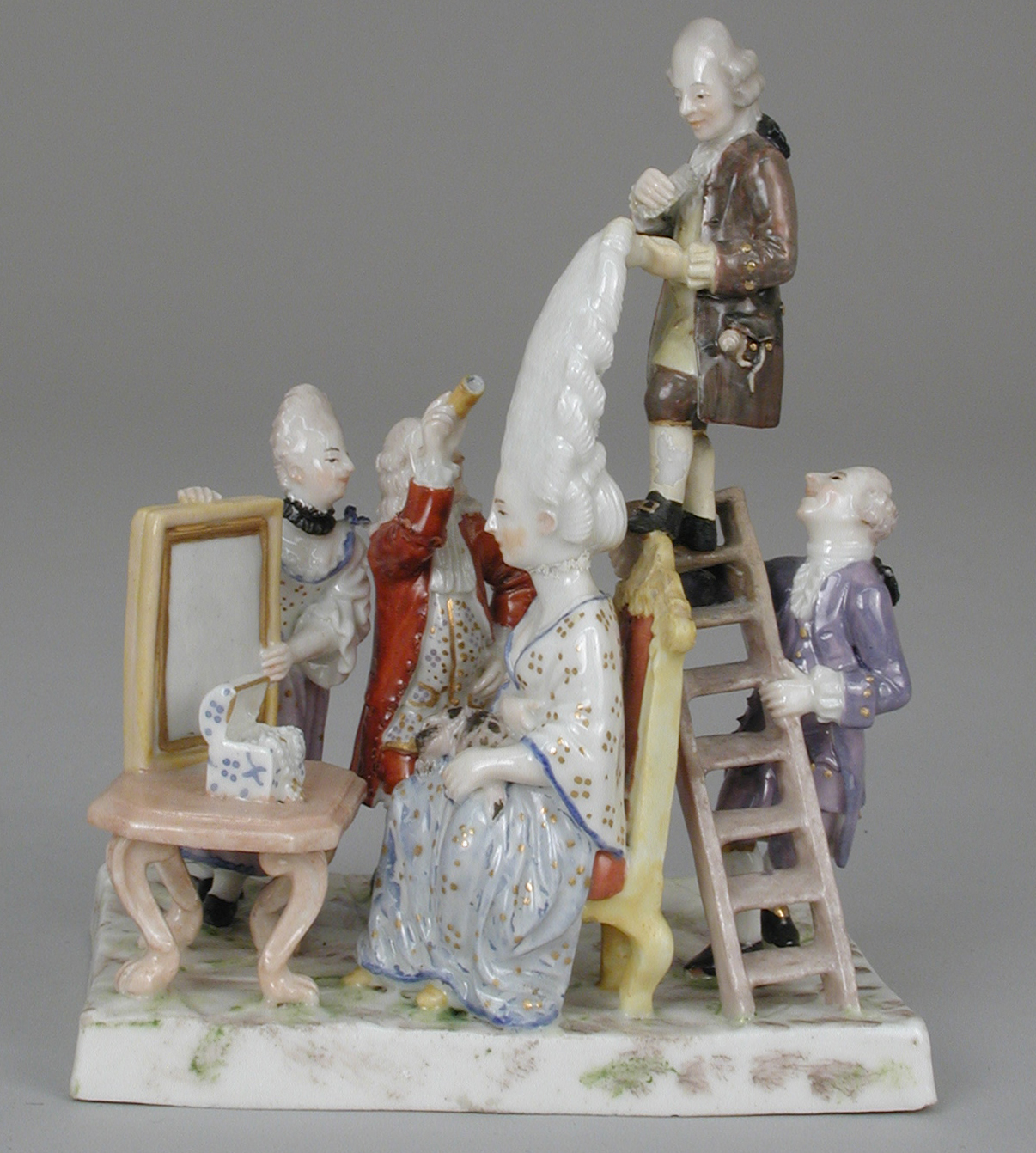
The Coiffure, 5 inches high, c. 1770. One of the men inspects the top of the coiffure through a telescope.

== Porcelain ==
The Ludwigsburg body was much "greyer and smokier in tone" than other German factories. The Encyclopédie Méthodique describes Ludwigsburg porcelain as resisting sudden change in temperature and fire, but that the glazing and desired white color of the product was inferior to Frankenthal porcelain.

The first marking stamped onto Ludwigsburg porcelain consisted of two intersecting Cs topped with a crown, possibly inspiring the nickname "Kronenburg", though sometimes the crown did not appear above the letters. From 1758 to 1770, Ludwigsburg porcelain was marked with a crown and the letters "T.R.", though the arms of the Duchy of Württemberg also appeared rarely. Every piece of Ludwigsburg porcelain made from 1948 to 2009 has a "Decorator Signature" in addition to standard manufactory markings.

The largest and best collection is in the palace where it was made, in the Keramikmuseum, a branch of the Landesmuseum Württemberg, which has 2,000 pieces.

== Later companies ==
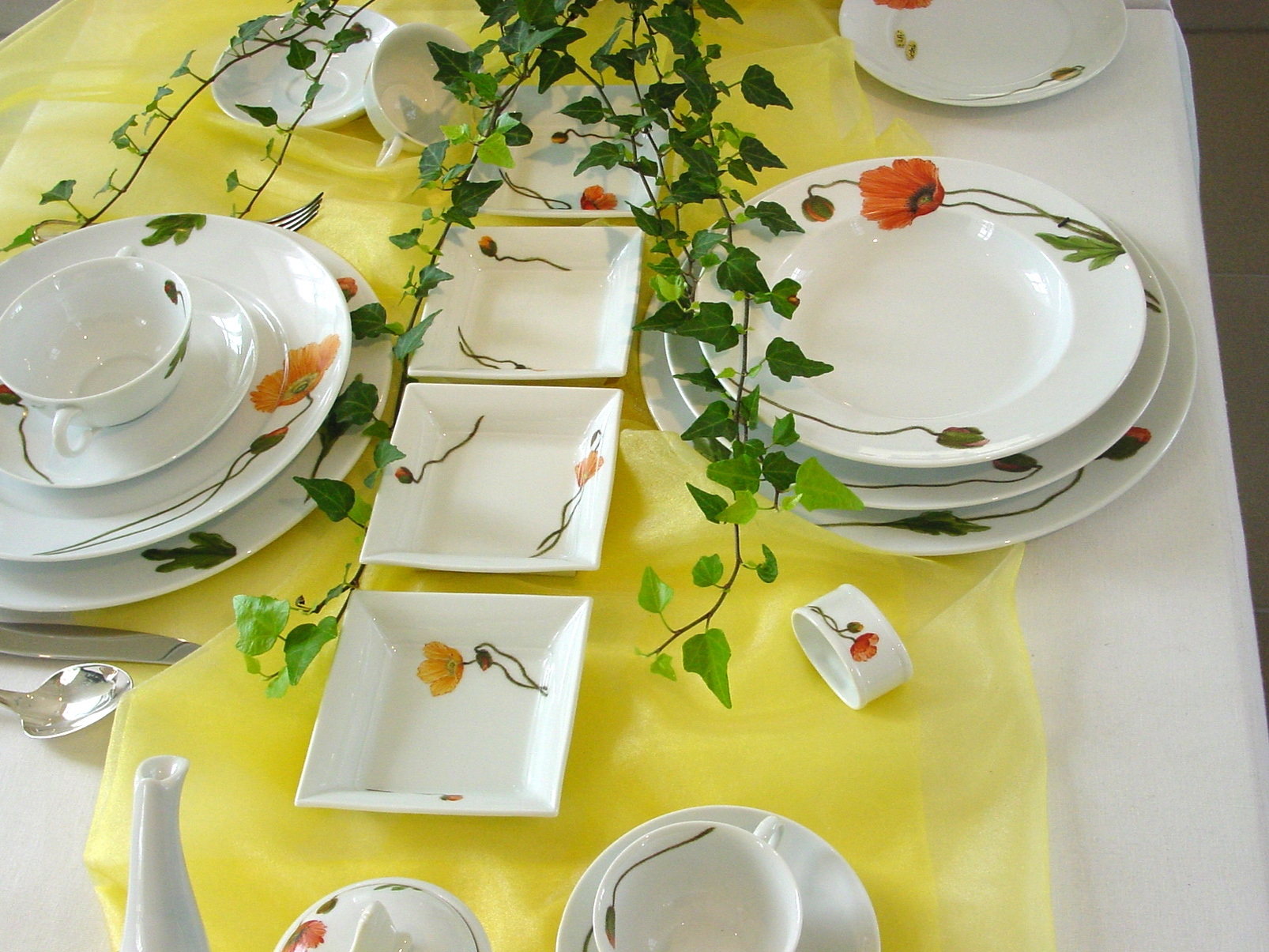
Modern Porzellan-Manufaktur Ludwigsburg GmbH "Poppy" pattern

In 1904, the Württembergische Porzellanmanufaktur Bauer & Pfeiffer, though located in Schorndorf, became the first successor to the palace manufactory under the mark of a crown and the words "Alt-Ludwigsburg". The government of the Kingdom of Württemberg allowed the company's operations, despite the questionable legality of its marks, and by 1913 it had 200 employees. In 1917, the company went public and filed for permission to use the royal manufactory's marks. This was granted in 1918 on the condition that the Württembergische Porzellanmanufaktur would add its initials (WPM) to avoid passing off. However, the company's chief decorator wanted to use the royal manufactory's markings with no alteration, and left the company over the issue. In February 1919, he formed the Porzellan-Manufaktur Alt-Ludwigsburg GmbH in Ludwigsburg itself. Alt-Ludwigsburg was sued by the Württembergische Porzellanmanufaktur in the Ludwigsburg district courts on 13 June 1919. In the final ruling, on 12 December 1919, Alt-Ludwigsburg was forced to adopt new markings and became a court-managed company that, in 1921, was entrusted with producing Notgeld. Alt-Ludwigsburg then ran into financial troubles and was dissolved in 1927, while the WPM was successful for a time before also being dissolved in 1934.

In 1926, Otto Wanner-Brandt desired to recreate the successes of the original porcelain manufactory. He purchased the manufactory's trademark rights for 50 years, but was unable to found the Porzellan-Manufaktur Ludwigsburg GmbH until 1948, in Ludwigsburg. The venture was an immediate success, as Wanner-Brandt's use of the original moulds and glaze compositions allowed patrons to order exact recreations of Ludwigsburg porcelains. The manufactory moved to Ludwigsburg Palace in 1967, and in 1994 was recognized by the Württembergische Hypothekenbank for preserving the tradition of porcelain-making in the city. The establishment of an advisory and quality control board in the next year reaffirmed that commitment for reproductions and new wares. Like other porcelain factories, the manufactory was a subsidizing company whose losses were borne by its shareholders. In 2002, those shareholders subsidized €2 million. However, it ran into financial trouble, and in 2004 was taken over by EganaGoldpfeil. When EganaGoldpfeil went bankrupt, the manufactory also filed for bankruptcy in the Ludwigsburg district courts on 29 August 2008.

After months of searching, a buyer for the manufactory was found in Lucas A.G., a Swiss holding firm with Russian investors. Now called Schlossmanufaktur Ludwigsburg GmbH, the manufacturing of contemporary porcelain at Ludwigsburg Palace resumed and the lease on space in the palace was extended to 31 December 2015. However, the business was not a success, and the last production was in 2010, when an expensive problem with the kiln developed. CEO Maxim Gennel confirmed that the company filed for bankruptcy in March 2014, but was then confident that the company would survive. A lawyer in Stuttgart, Stephan Rüdlin, became the insolvency administrator. The closure of the manufactory was announced in October 2015.

== Gallery ==
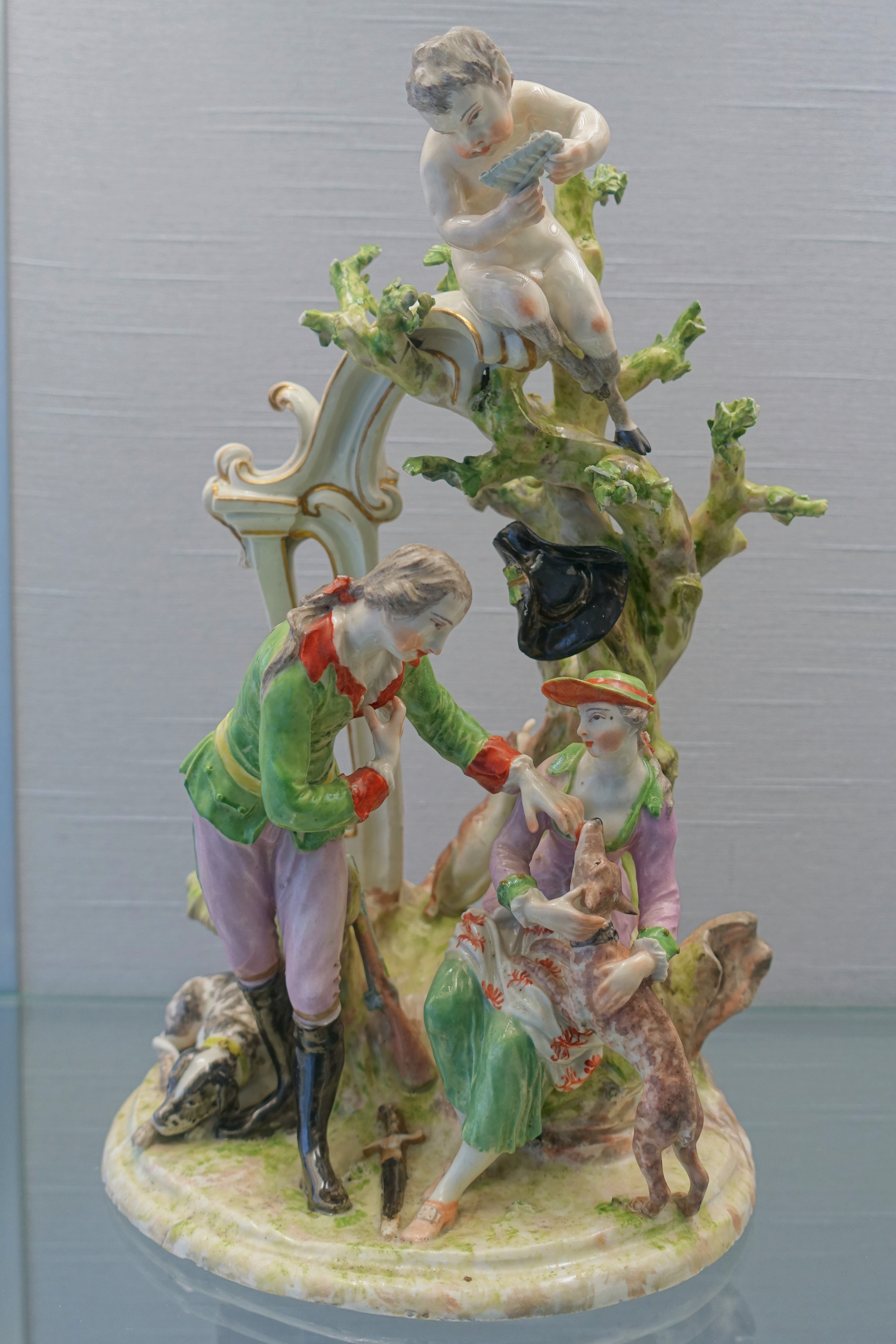
"Two Hunters" group by Johann Wilhelm Beyer, c. 1763

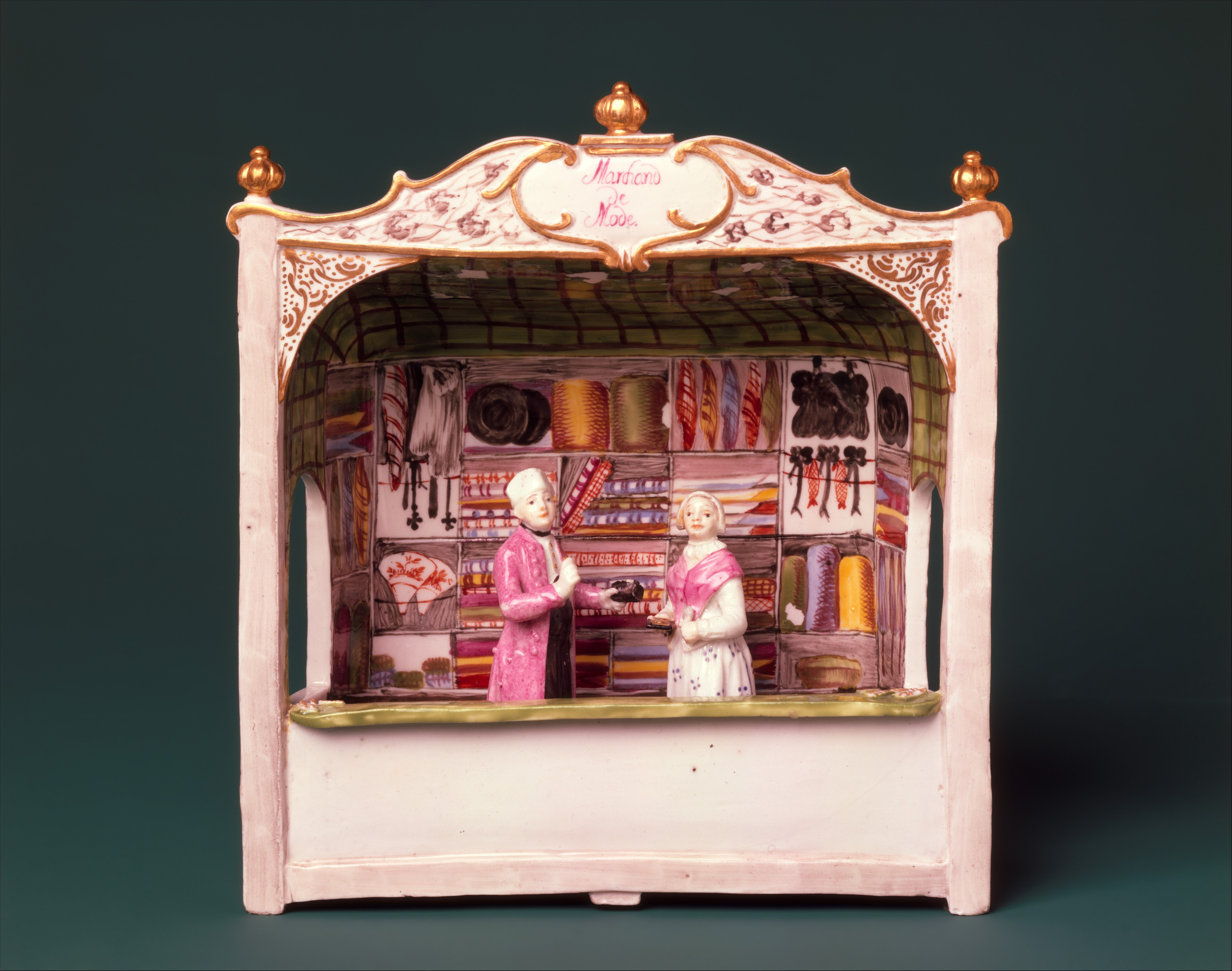
Venetian fair shop, "Marchand de Mode", with two figures, c. 1665, 6 inches high

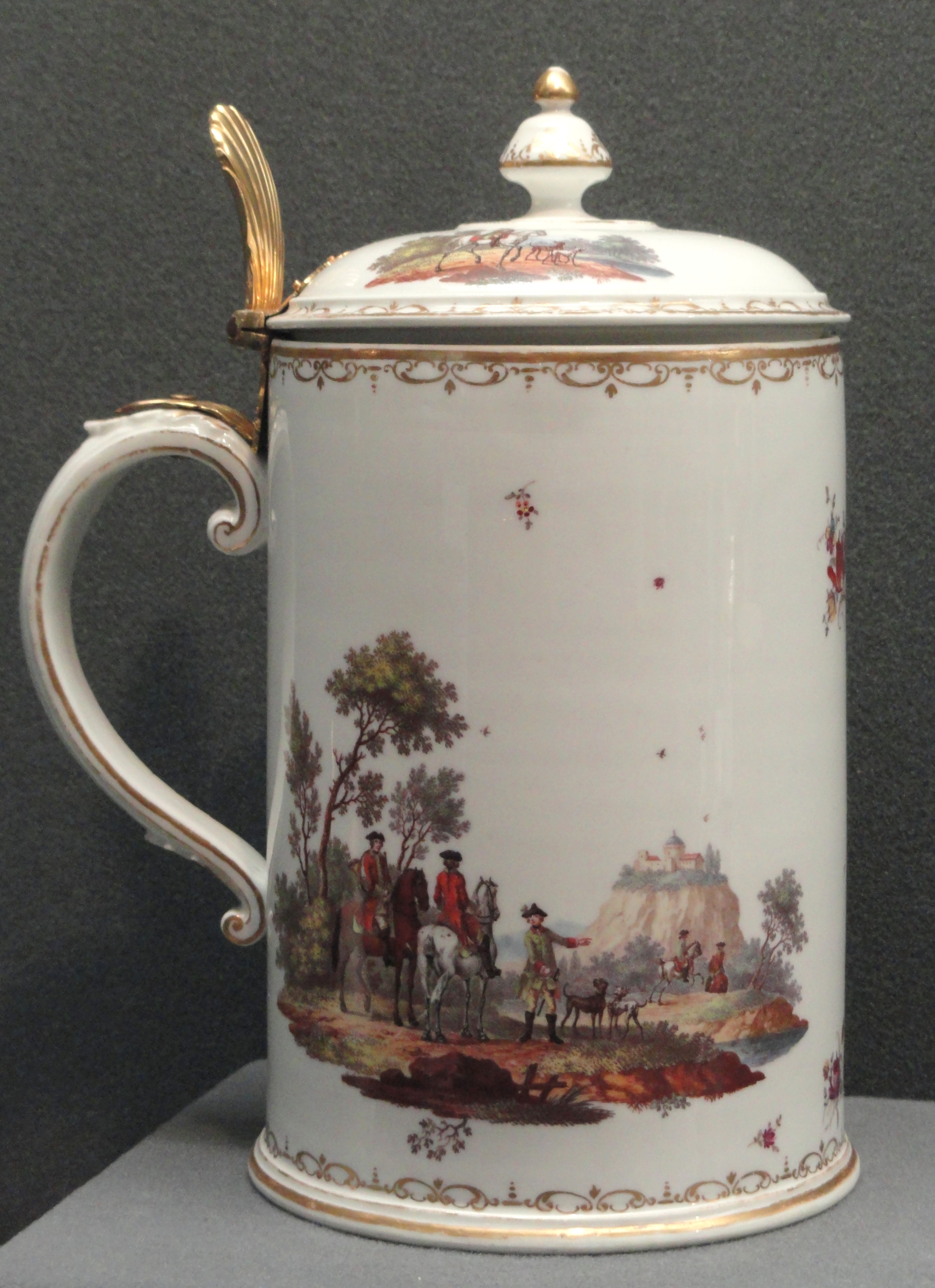
Tankard with Hunting Scenes, c. 1759-1775

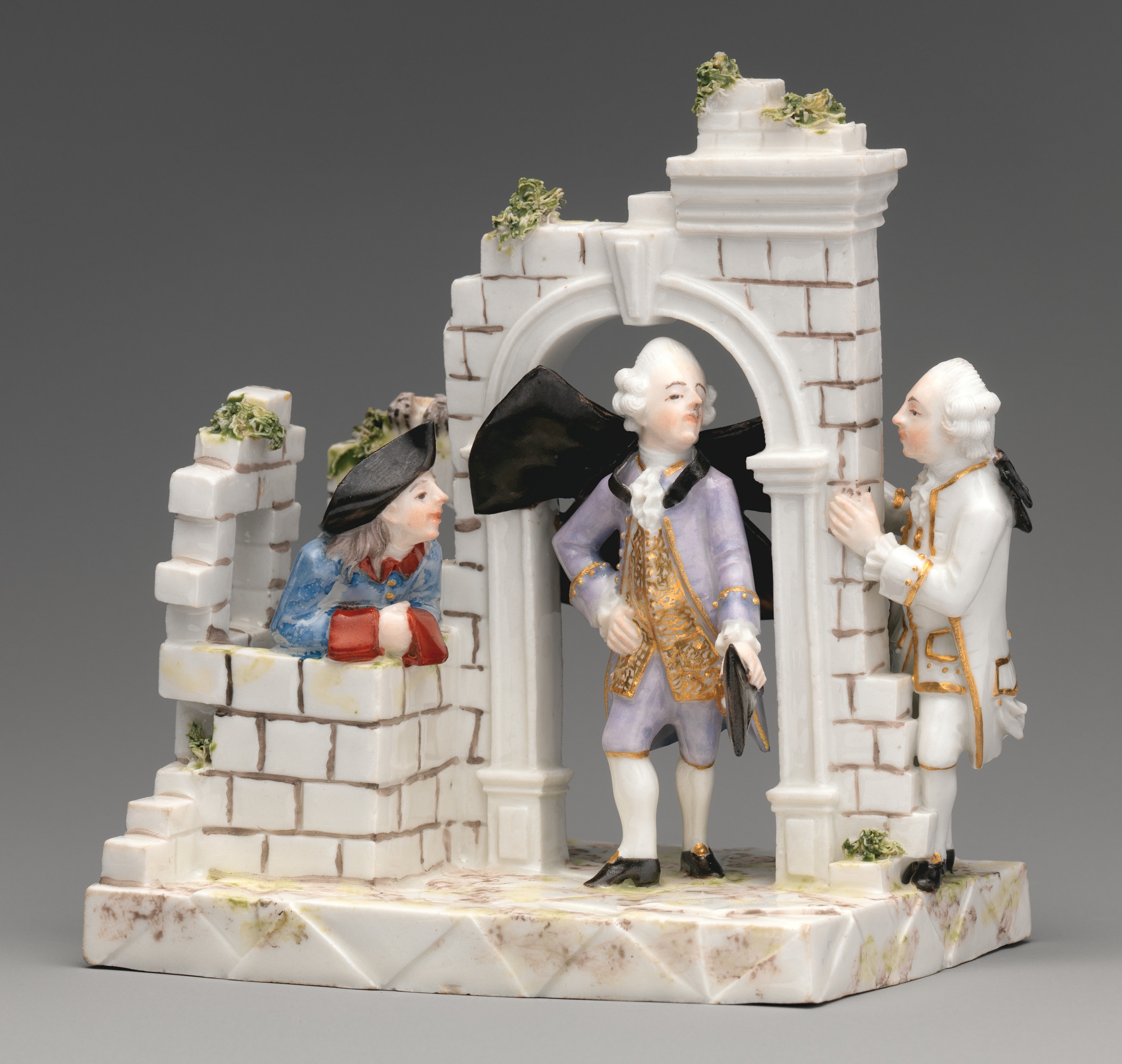
"The Large Bow", c. 1770, attributed to Riedel, 4.5 inches high

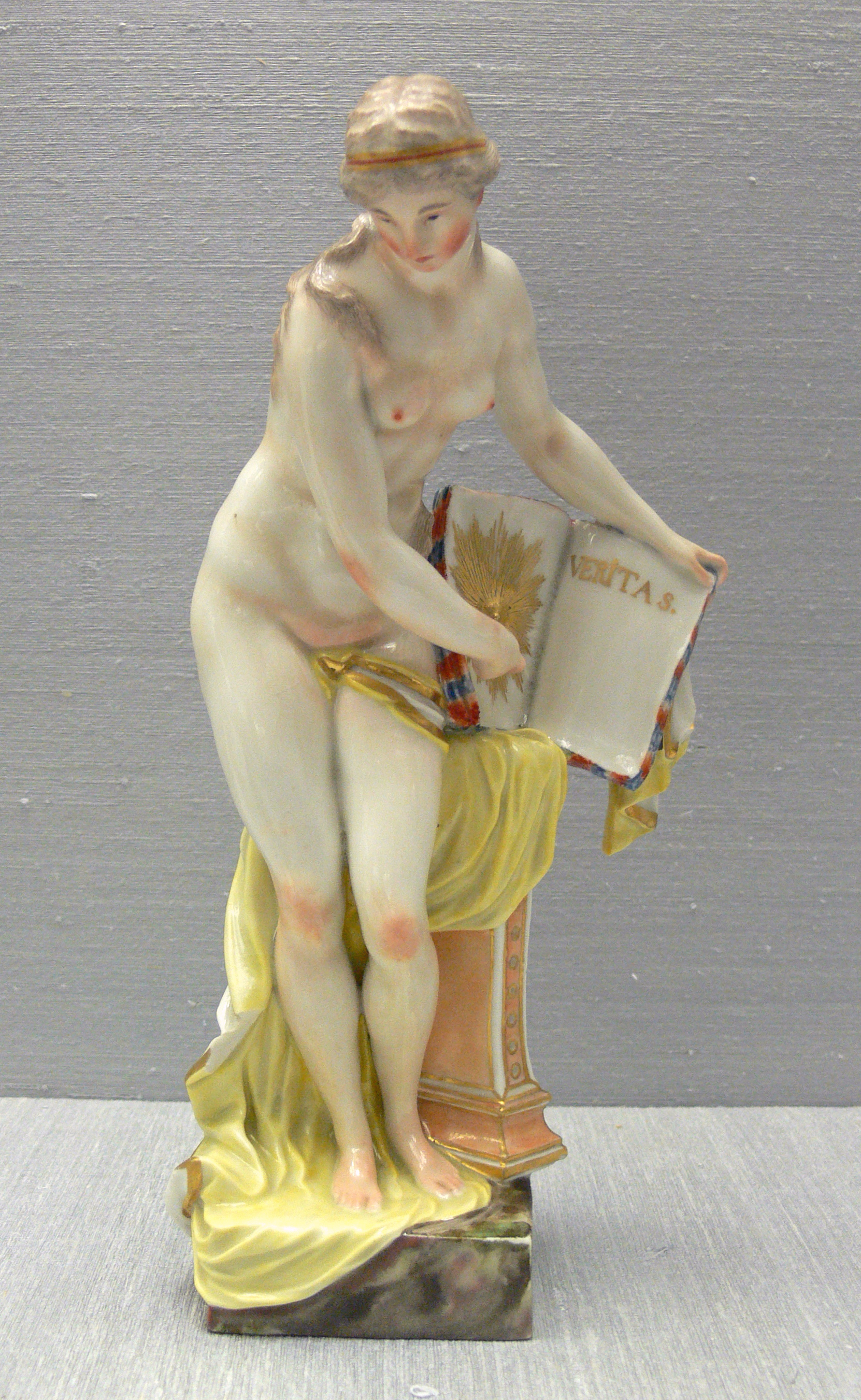
Truth by Beyer, c. 1770

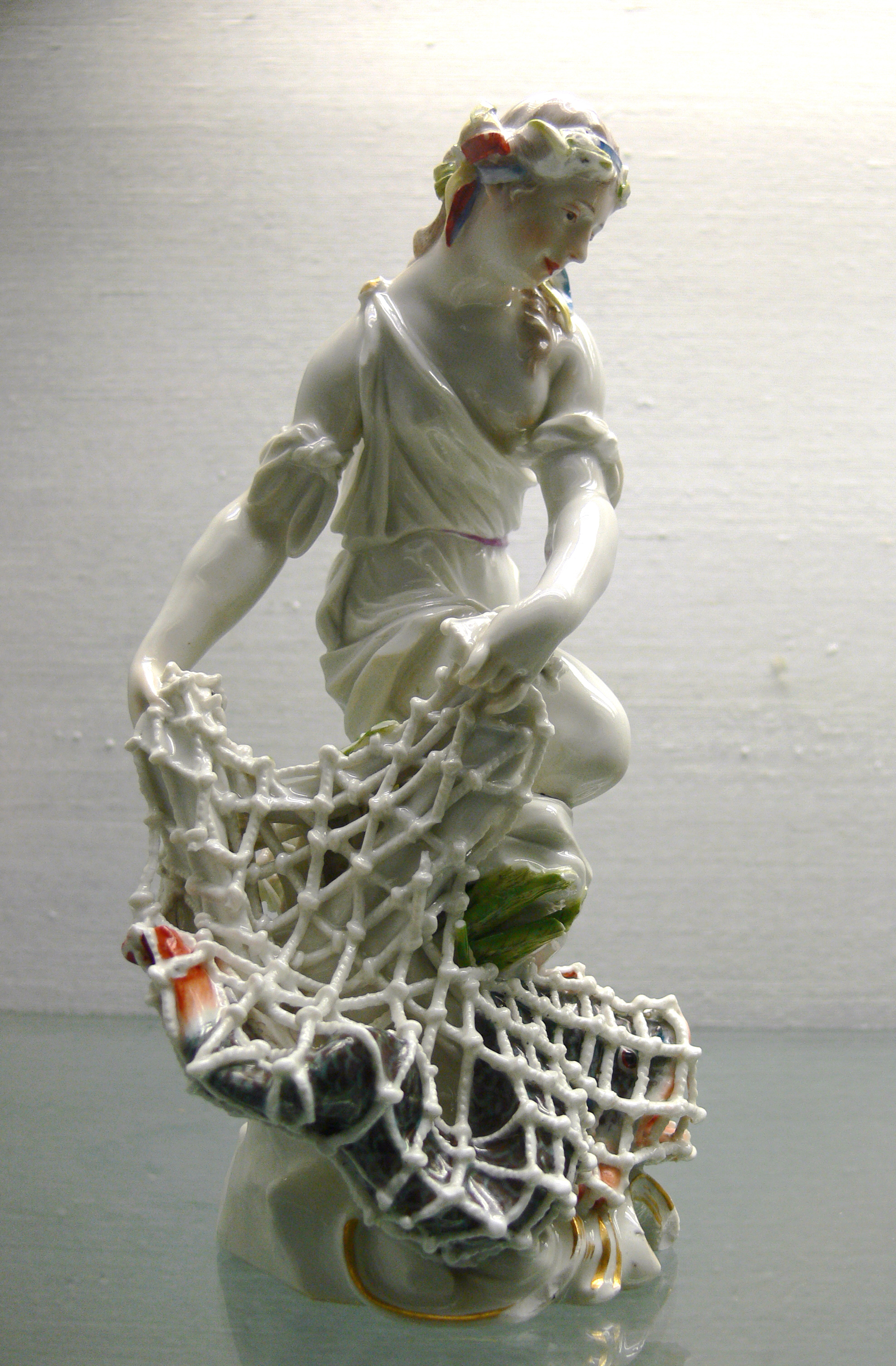
Fisherwoman, modelled by Beyer, 1774

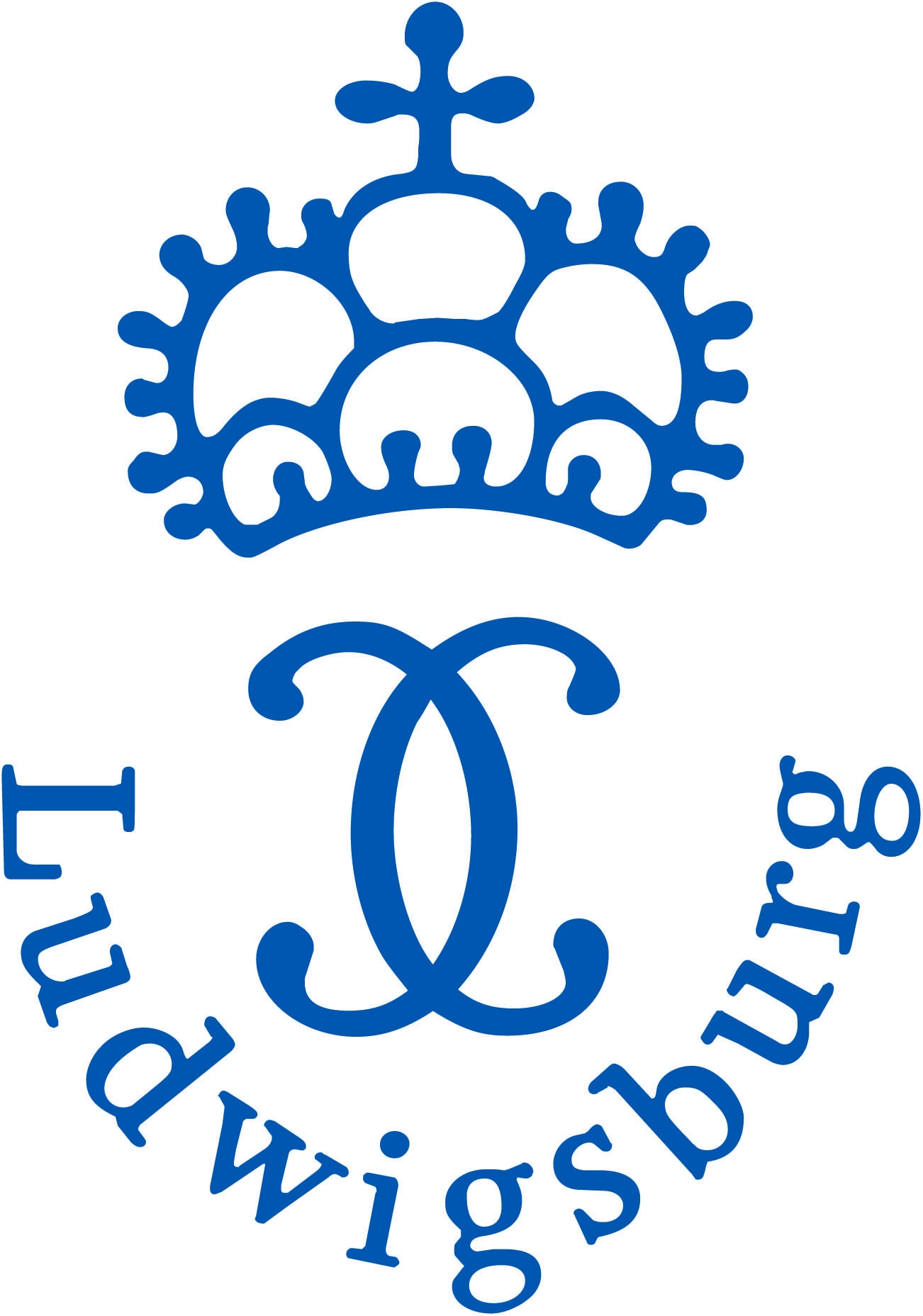
Form of the factory mark used in 2006 by Porzellanmanufaktur Ludwigsburg.
