= Vera Michurina-Samoilova =

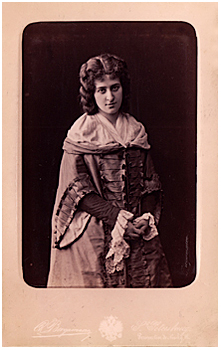

Vera Arkadyevna Michurina-Samoilova (Russian: Вера Аркадьевна Мичурина-Самойлова; 17 May 1866 – 2 November 1948) was a Russian and Soviet stage actress.

She was born in Saint Petersburg, into the Samoilov theatre family.

Michurina-Samoilova debuted on stage in 1886. She often appeared at the Alexandrinsky Theatre. Among her notable roles were Reneve in Light Without Heat (by Alexander Ostrovsky and Nikolai Solovyov), Natalia Petrovna in Turgenev's A Month in the Country, Ranevskaia in Chekhov's The Cherry Orchard, and Lady Milford in Schiller's Intrigue and Love.

The 1917 October Revolution and the establishment of the Soviet state occurred when Michurina-Samoilova was just over 50. Her notable roles in Soviet Russia included Zvezdintseva in Tolstoy's The Fruits of Enlightenment, Khlestova in Griboyedov's Woe from Wit, Polina Bardina in Gorky's Enemies, and Gurmyzhskaya in Ostrovsky's The Forest.

During the Siege of Leningrad, Michurina-Samoilova remained in the city; she was 75 by then and her health did not permit her to be evacuated. During the siege she participated in the cultural resistance, performing in the readings and plays of the Microphone Theatre. She published a memoir, Sixty Years in the Arts in 1949, including her description of the siege.

Michurina-Samoilova died in Leningrad, aged 82.

== Awards and honors ==
- Order of the Red Banner of Labour (1937)
- People's Artist of the RSFSR
- People's Artist of the USSR (1939)
- Stalin Prize, 1st class (1943)
- Order of Lenin (1946)
- Medal "For Valiant Labour in the Great Patriotic War 1941–1945"
- Medal "For the Defence of Leningrad"
