= Gasparo Angiolini =

Italian ballet dancer, composer, and choreographer (1731–1803)

- Born: Domenico Maria Angiolo Gasparini; 9 February 1731; Florence, Italy
- Died: 6 February 1803 (aged 71); Milan, Italy
- Occupations: Dancer, choreographer and composer
- Spouse: Marie Thérèse Foliazzi
- Children: 2

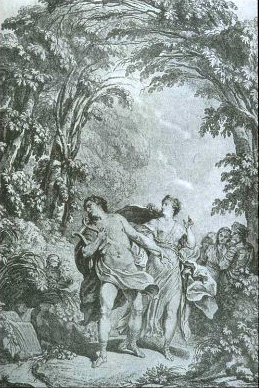
Title page of the original full score of Gluck's 1762 opera Orfeo ed Euridice (Duchesne, Paris, 1764). [The original image has been cropped and lightened.

Gasparo Angiolini (7 February 1731 – 6 February 1803), real name Domenico Maria Gasparo, son of Francesco Angiolini and Maria Maddalena Torzi, was an Italian dancer, choreographer and composer. He was born in Florence and died in Milan.

== Life and career ==
He is known thanks to the polemics with the French ballet master Jean-Georges Noverre. Gasparo Angiolini directed the ballet at the Imperial Theatre in Vienna, taking over the post in 1758, working closely with Christoph Willibald von Gluck on such works as Don Juan ou le Festin de Pierre (1761), and the opera Orfeo ed Euridice (1762). The dancing in both Don Juan and Orpheus was said to have insisted on the "primacy of drama". In addition to collaborating with Gluck, he also composed music for many of his ballets.

He later succeeded Franz Hilverding as director of the Imperial Theatre in St. Petersburg, Russia in 1766. Both Hilverding and Angiolini are credited with bringing the pantomime ballet to Russia. Likewise, Angiolini also attempted to introduce elements of Russian culture into his own work through the use of songs, folk dances, and Russian themes.

In 1772–1773, Angiolini worked in Teatro San Benedetto in Venice. In 1778, he came to Milan to direct the theatre of La Scala.

Angiolini was a choreographer interested in the dramatic possibilities of dance. He was also an early spokesman for a sense of Italian nationalism and spoke of the sad state where Germany and Russia were supporting better cultural institutions than Italy.

His wife was a ballerina Marie Thérèse Foliazzi (1733–1792). Giacomo Casanova was in love with her and admits in his memoirs that he stole her portrait.

His son (or nephew) Pietro Angiolini was also a dancer and choreographer; his daughter Fortunata Angiolini (1776–1817) and her partner Armand Vestris danced in Lisbon and London with great success.

Gasparo Angiolini was a ballet teacher of Vincenzo Galeotti.
