= Les petits riens =

1778 ballet by W. A. Mozart and others

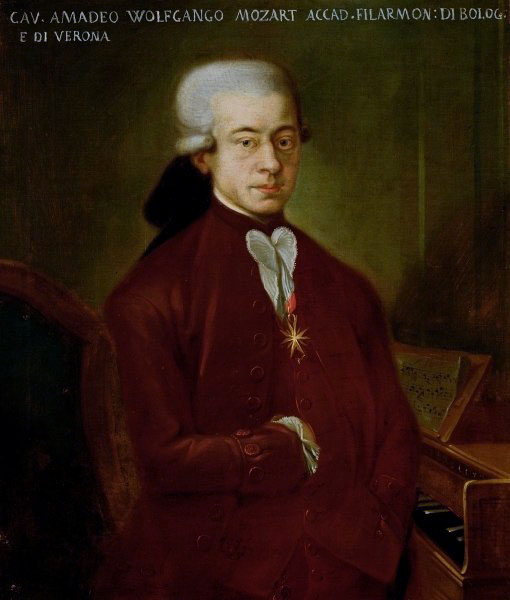
1777 portrait of Mozart

Les petits riens (French for "The Little Nothings") is a ballet in one act and three tableaux by Jean-Georges Noverre, with music by Wolfgang Amadeus Mozart and other, unknown composers, first performed at the Academie Royale de Musique in Paris on 11 June 1778. The score consists of 20 numbers, of which Mozart composed the overture and nos. 9–12, 15, 16 and 18.

The three tableaux are described in the Journal de Paris:

1. l'Amour pris au filet et mis en cage. "Love caught in a net and put in a cage", performed by Marie-Madeleine Guimard, Auguste Vestris and a young child.
2. Jeu de Colin-Maillard. The story of Jean Colin-Maillard was a legend about a warrior who fought on even with his eyes poked out. His name is the French word for the game Blind man's buff. The main role in this scene was performed by Jean Dauberval. Such playful scenery usually had flirtatious connotations, which is famously depicted by Fragonard in his painting Le Collin-Maillard.
3. Espieglerie de l'Amour. "Playfulness of love" is a pastoral scene about a woman, played by Mlle Asselin, disguised as a male shepherd. Two other shepherdesses, performed by Marie-Madeleine Guimard and Marie Allard, fall in love with the shepherd. Finally, to disenchant the two shepherdesses the impostor ends up revealing her breasts to them.

While Mozart was staying in Paris, Noverre asked him to compose a new score for a ballet that he had created in Vienna in 1767. The ballet was to be danced as an interlude in the new opera Le finte gemelle (1771) by Niccolò Piccinni. The opera was a flop and closed after four performances. Although the ballet music was well-received, Mozart was not credited with it, and he was at the time little known in Paris.

The score, catalogued as K. Anh. 10/299b, was thought lost, but it was rediscovered in the Paris Opera's archives in the late 19th century and has since entered both the ballet and symphonic repertoire. The Passepied (nr. 11) in D major is reminiscent of the first movement of Tchaikovsky's Souvenir de Florence, Op. 70; a D minor version of the melody appears in bars 5 and 6. The motive derived from this is used throughout the piece.

The German musicologist Ernst Fritz Schmid has proposed that the Gavotte in B-flat major, K. 300, was originally intended as an inserted movement of Les petits riens. Written between May and June 1778, Schmid sees no other reason why the composer would have composed stand-alone dance music in Paris whilst he was already writing a ballet. The piece was subsequently laid aside for unknown reasons.
