= Les Fêtes Chinoises =

18th-century ballet by Jean-Georges Noverre

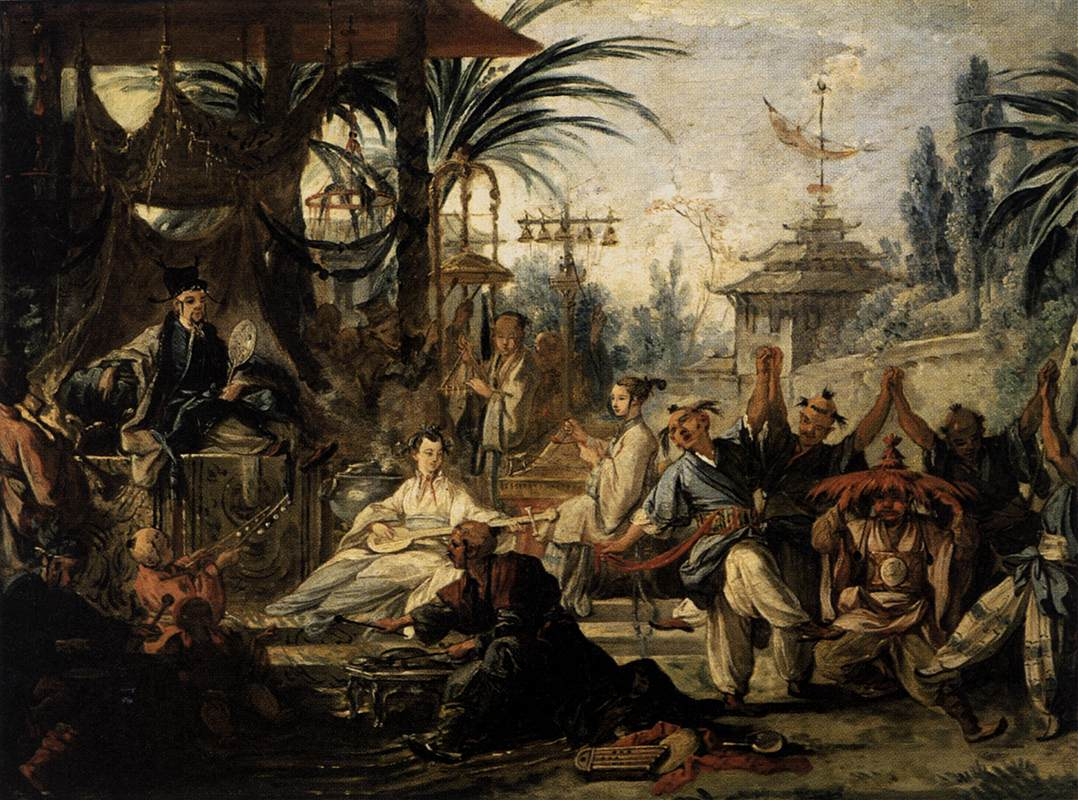
Costume and scene in Chinese Dance (1742) by François Boucher may have inspired Les Fêtes Chinoises.

Les Fêtes Chinoises is an 18th-century ballet by Jean-Georges Noverre (1727–1810). The exact date of the ballet's composition is unknown.

== Background ==
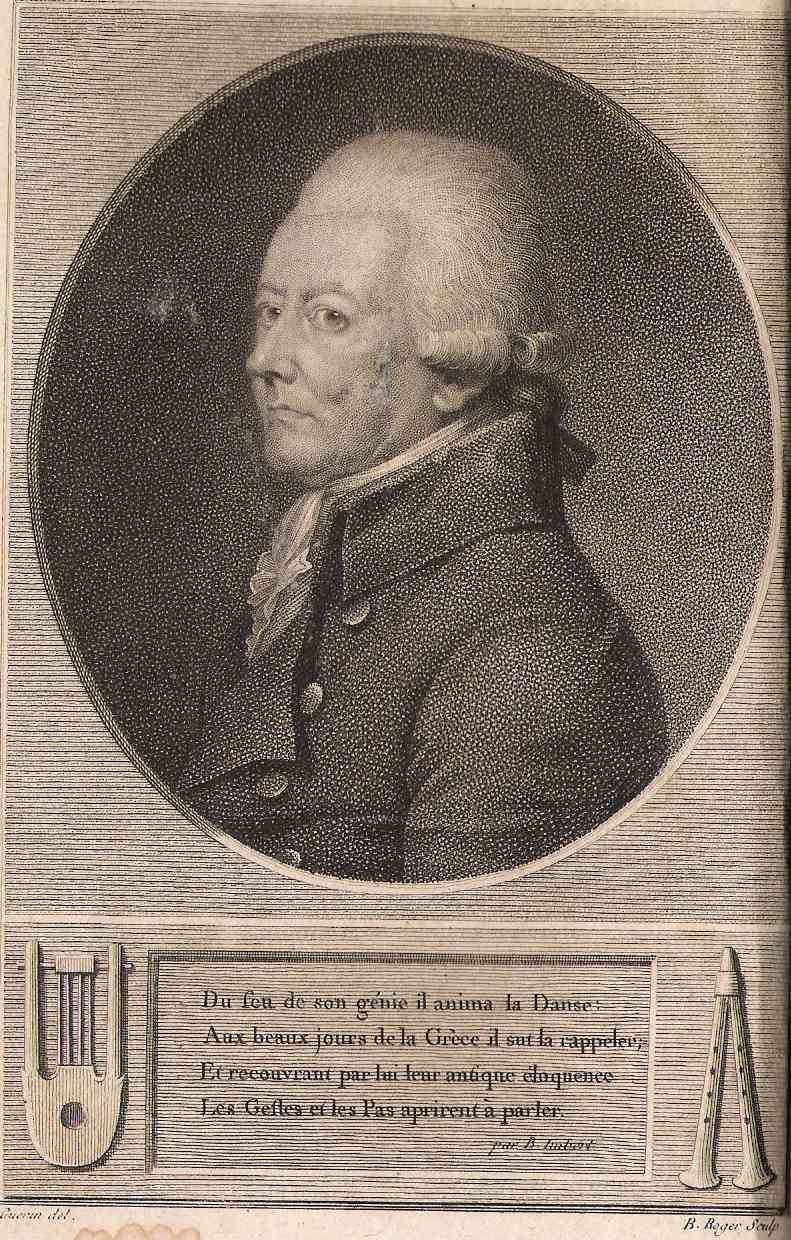
Noverre, 1807

Before Noverre there was no dance technique involved in ballets; such spectacles were loosely organized around a story or theme, but the dance movement itself was largely formal and ornamental, with only a very limited range of mime gestures to convey the action. He used this new, revolutionary production as a response and a contrast to the ballets of the time. "Noverre points out, this kind of performer is rare. He…thinks that the actor-dancer must rise to the challenge of translating a verbal description into stage action, that this involves not just performance, but interpretation."

The ballet designs were the fruit of Boucher's friendship with Jean Monnet, which had resulted in designs for Monnet at the Théâtre de la Foire de Saint Laurent "as early as 1743." Le Nouveau Calendrier des spectacles de Paris described the scene of Les Fêtes Chinoises as "an avenue ending in terraces and a flight of steps leading to a palace" then changing to a public square decorated for a festival and continuing with subsequent scene shifts of which the Calendrier remarked "M. Monnet has spared nothing that could possibly assist M. Noverre's rich imagination".

== Plot summary ==
J. des Boulmiers, an eyewitness to a performance of Les Fêtes Chinoises wrote:

[...] a public square decorated for a festival with, in the background, an amphitheatre on which are seated sixteen Chinese [and] thirty-two are seen on the gradins (stepped tiers) going through a pantomime. As the first group descends, sixteen further Chinese, both mandarins and slaves, come out of their habitations [...]. All these form eight rows of dancers who, rising and dipping in succession, imitate fairly well the billows of a stormy sea. All the Chinese, having descended, begin a character march. There are a mandarin, borne in a rich palanquin by six white slaves, whilst two negros draw a chariot on which a young Chinese woman is seated. They are preceded and followed by a host of Chinese playing various musical instruments [...]. This march concluded, the ballet begins and leaves nothing to be desired either in the diversity or in the neatness of the figures. It ends in a contredanse of thirty-two persons whose movements trace a prodigious number of new and perfectly designed attitudes, which form and dissolve with the greatest of ease. At the end [...] the Chinese return to their place on the amphitheatre, which is transformed into a china cabinet. Thirty-two vases, which rise up, conceal [...] the thirty-two Chinese one saw before.

Considering that most performances (theatrical and ballet) before this took place in either the royal courts or in inn yards, taverns, or pubs, having that many people on the stage at one time was unheard of. However, Lincoln Kirstein adds that it "consisted of dance pictures with little plot, incorporating elements of the real and ideal, including the exotic China of travelers and explorers and the fantastic Cathay of Rococo chinoiserie designers." Furthermore, the costumes were "untraditional"—they were based on Roman armor and had Chinese embellishments on them.

== Paris production, 1754 ==
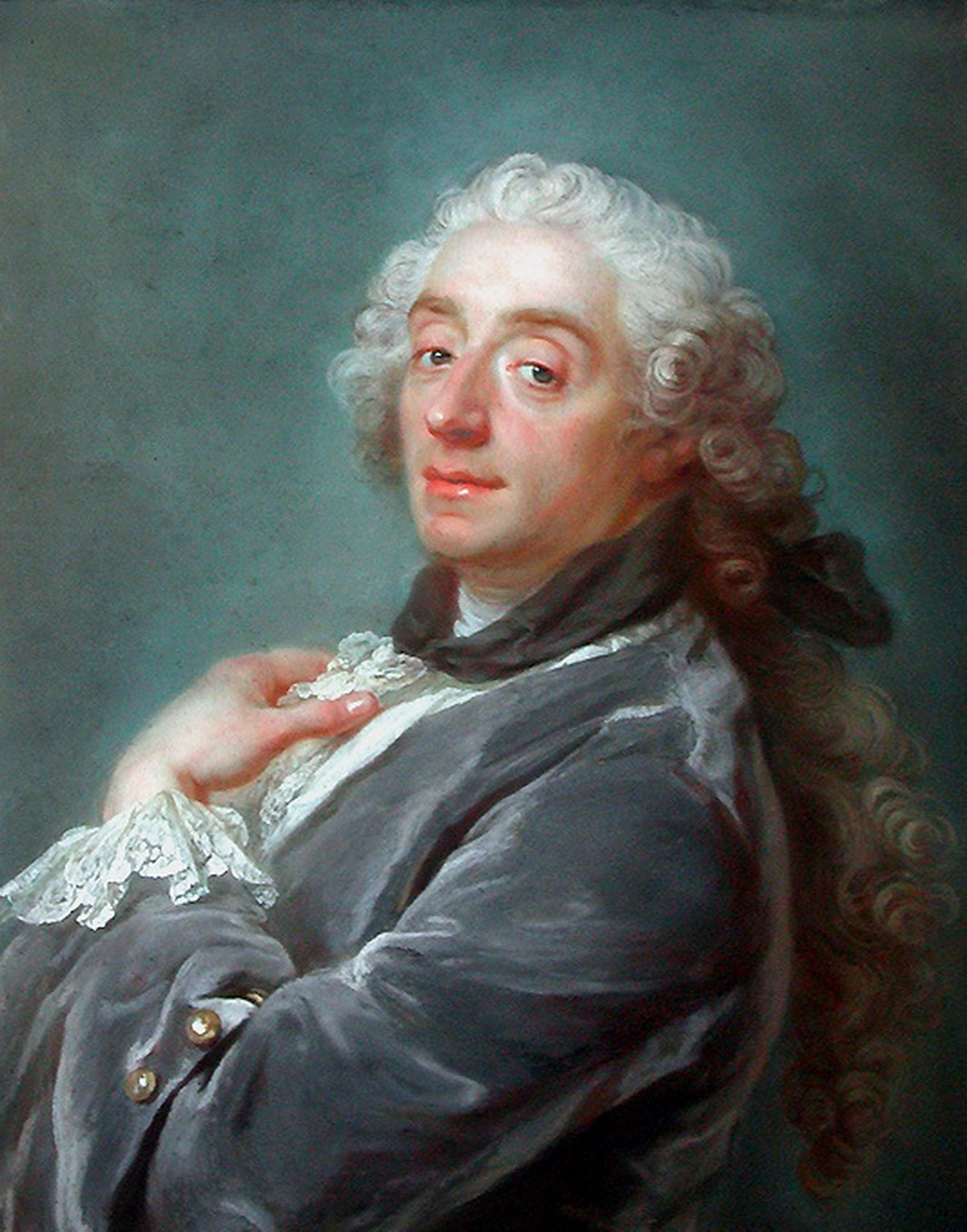
Boucher, 1741

Designs for the decor were worked up into full-scale cartoons by Jean-Joseph Dumons, and woven nine times, first in 1743 and last in 1775, when their rococo pastorale galante would have begun to seem a bit stale.

== Reception ==
Les Fêtes Chinoises was Noverre's first great success. In a grudging journal entry the dramatist Charles Collé remarked in July 1754: "This month, all Paris has flocked to a Chinese ballet, given at the Opéra Comique. I do not like ballets, and my aversion to dancing has greatly increased since all the theatres have become infected with ballets; but I must admit that this Chinese ballet is unusual and at least by its novelty and its picturesqueness it has earned a share of the applause it is given." On 1 July 1754, the Mercure de France observed that the ballet was mounted with extraordinary luxury and in August reported that "the multitude flocked to see it with unprecedented furore."
