= Ballet de la Merlaison =

1635 French ballet de cour

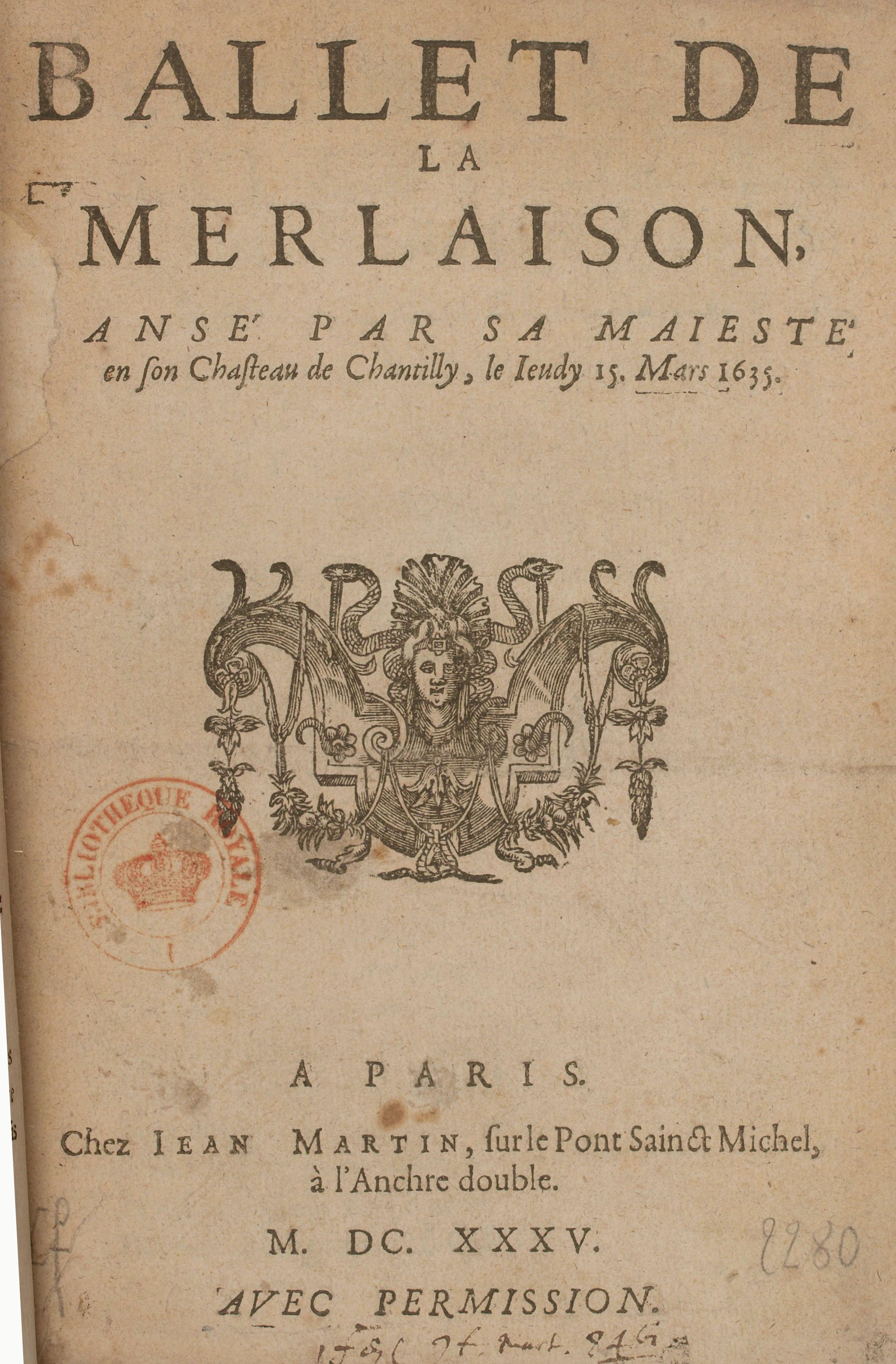
Title page of the programme booklet for the first performance of the Ballet de la Merlaison

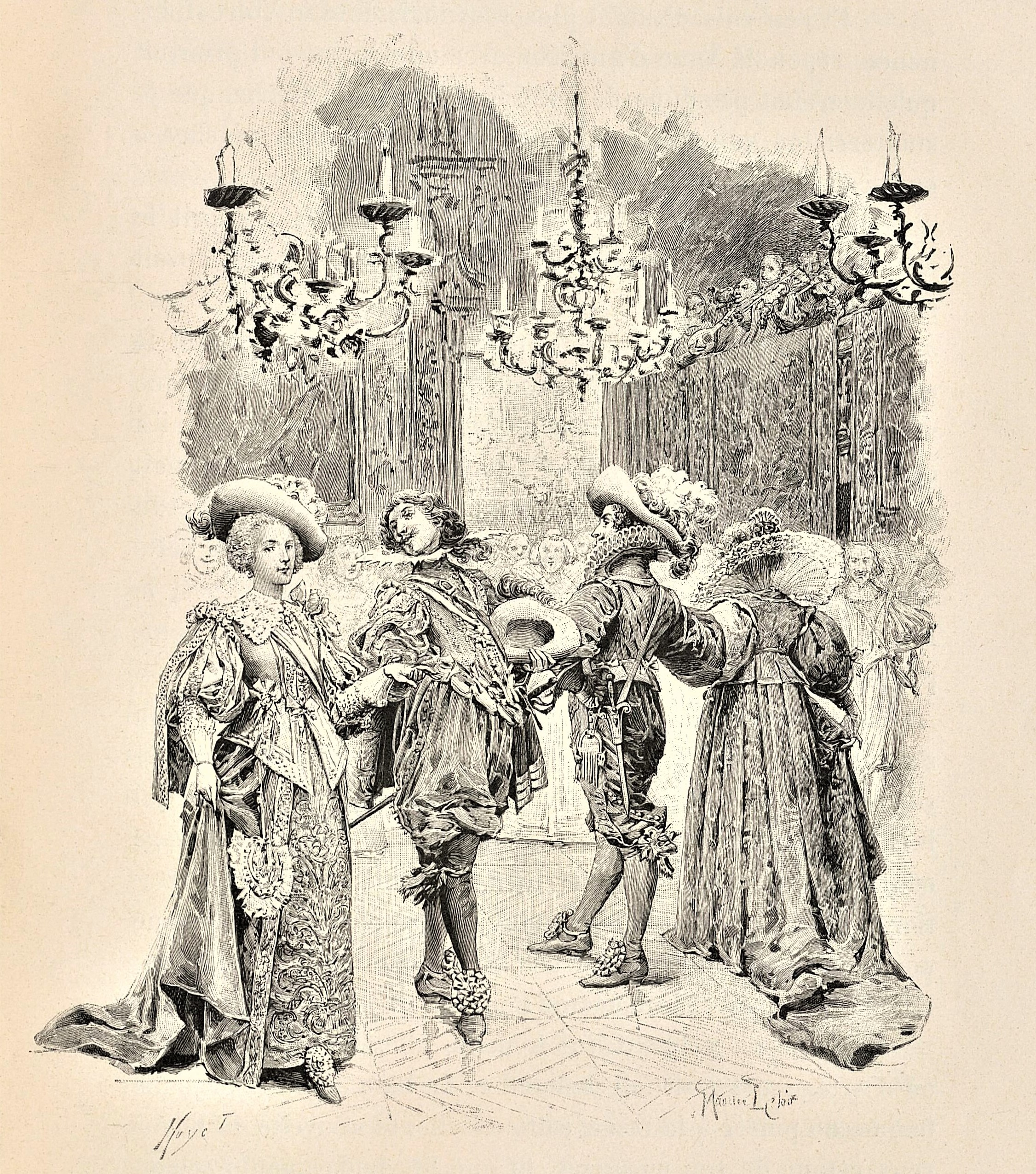
An illustration of the Ballet de la Merlaison from "The Three Musketeers" by Maurice Leloir.

The Ballet de la Merlaison (Ballet of the Blackbird Hunt) is a ballet de cour first performed on 15 March 1635 at the Château de Chantilly, during the reign of – and commonly attributed to – Louis XIII. It was later performed at Royaumont. “Merlaison” is a word coined by Louis to designate the feast which was held after a blackbird hunt. Louis created the scenario, wrote the music and the words, devised the choreography, designed the costumes, and danced roles as a woman, a merchant, a tax collector, and a mischievous blackbird, adept at avoiding traps. It is the most popular ballet performed during the reign of Louis XIII and marked an important development of the ballet de cour.

== Music ==
The music of this ballet à entrées is considered to be written with the participation of Louis XIII. While some claim he had written only a few airs, most experts consider the entire ballet to be written by Louis XIII. The music is very typical for the era of Louis XIII, yet it is very interesting for modern musicologists, since it is crucial for the understanding of development from Late Renaissance to Early and High Baroque music.

== Recordings and depictions in fiction ==
- A full recording of the Ballet de la Merlaison was made in 1967 by Roger Cotte and Jacques Chailley with the Groupe d'instruments anciens de Paris.
- Although the ballet is said to be composed in 1635, André Danican Philidor the elder includes in his "Recueil de plusieurs vieux Airs faites par Philidor l'Aîné" a concert, allegedly composed in 1627, which features the air "Les Gascons" from the ballet.
- In Alexandre Dumas' The Three Musketeers, at the famous ball where the queen recovers the diamond studs she had given to Buckingham, the Ballet de la Merlaison is performed. However, there are some historical errors: The Ballet de la Merlaison was first performed in 1635 at the Château de Chantilly, whereas this ball takes place at the Hôtel de Ville de Paris, before 1627 (since the Siege of La Rochelle started that year and is described from chapter 41 [The Siege of La Rochelle ] onwards, 19 chapters after the ball had taken place). Also, the Ballet de cour is described as a simple ball (with the men dancing with the ladies), not as a court spectacle which not only included dance, but acting and singing as well.

== Bibliography ==
- McGowan, Margaret M. (2001). "Louis XIII, King of France". Grove Music Online.
- Moote, Lloyd (1989). Louis XIII, the Just. Berkeley: University of California Press. ISBN 9780520064850.
