= Jean-Georges Noverre =

French dancer (1727–1810)

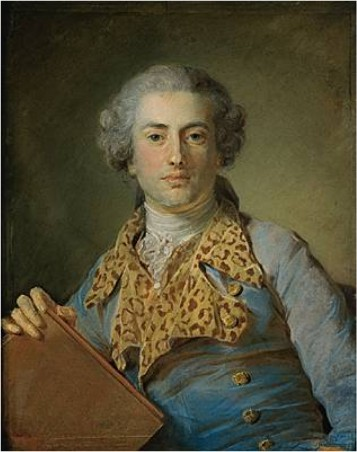
- Perronneau, 1764, Louvre
- Born: 29 April 1727; France
- Died: 19 October 1810 (aged 83); Saint-Germain-en-Laye, France
- Occupation: Dancer
- Career
- Former groups: Paris Opera Ballet

Jean-Georges Noverre (French pronunciation: [ʒɑ̃ ʒɔʁʒ nɔvɛʁ]; 29 April 1727 – 19 October 1810) was a French dancer and ballet master, and is generally considered the creator of ballet d'action, a precursor of the narrative ballets of the 19th century. His birthday is now observed as International Dance Day.

His first professional appearances occurred as a youth in Paris at the Opéra-Comique, at Fontainebleau, in Berlin before Frederick II and his brother Prince Henry of Prussia, in Dresden and Strasburg. In 1747 he moved to Strasbourg, where he remained until 1750 before moving to Lyon. In 1751, he composed his first great work, Les Fêtes Chinoises for Marseilles. The work was revived in Paris in 1754 to great acclaim. In 1755, he was invited by Garrick to London, where he remained for two years.

Between 1758 and 1760 he produced several ballets at Lyon, and published his Lettres sur la danse et les ballets. It is from this period that the revolution in the art of the ballet for which Noverre was responsible can be dated. Prior to Noverre, ballets were large spectacles that focused mainly on elaborate costumes and scenery and not on the physical and emotional expression of the dancers. He was next engaged by Duke Karl Eugen of Württemberg, and later Austrian Empress Maria Theresa, until 1774. In 1776, he was appointed maître des ballets of the Paris Opera at the request of Queen Marie Antoinette. He returned to Vienna in Spring of 1776 to stage ballets there, but in June 1776 he returned again to Paris. He regained this post until the French Revolution reduced him to poverty. He died on 19 October 1810 at Saint-Germain-en-Laye.

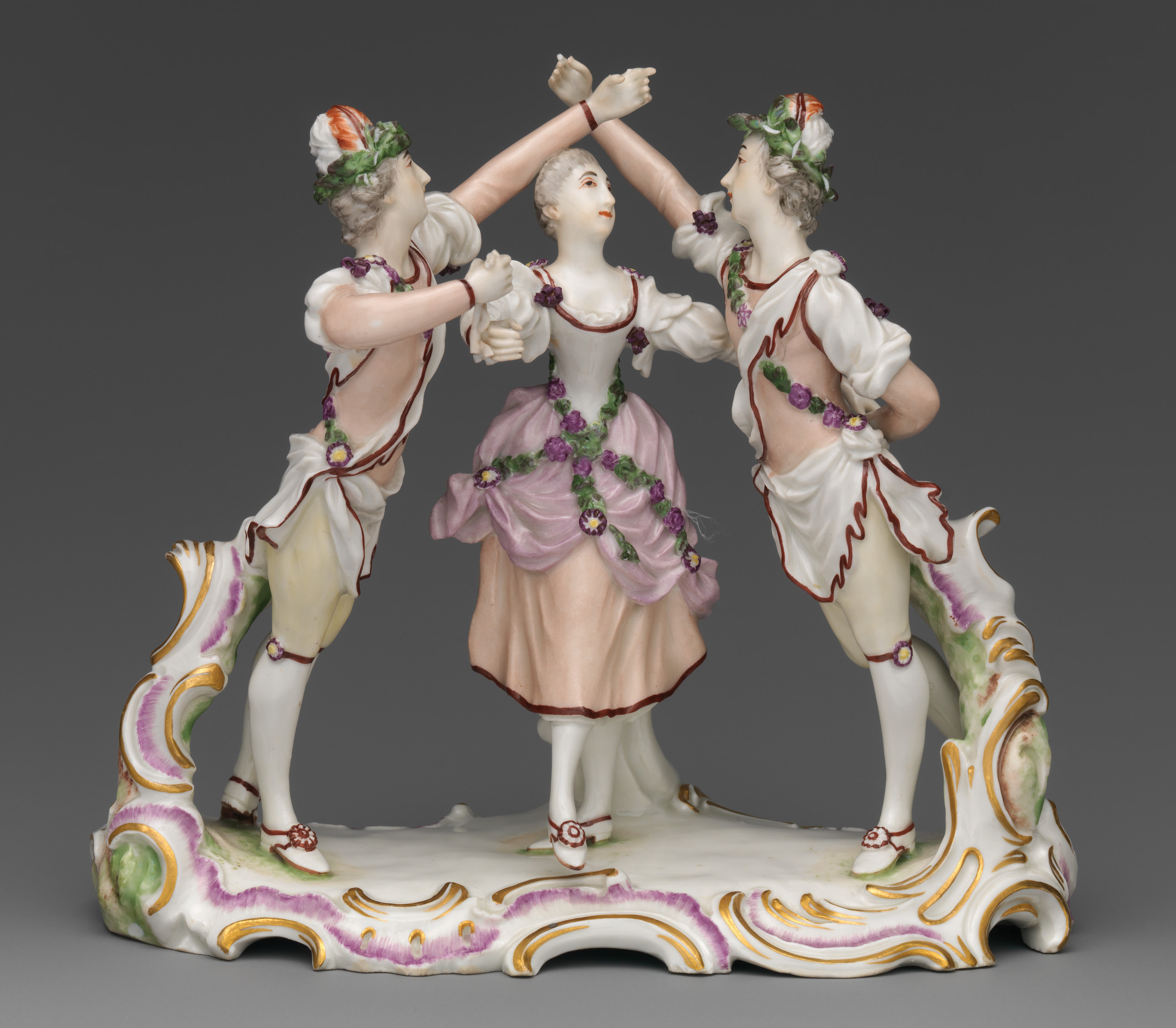
Pas-de-trois in Ludwigsburg porcelain, c. 1763, one of a series of groups probably directly taken from Noverre's ballets

Noverre's friends included Voltaire, Mozart, Frederick the Great and David Garrick (who called him "the Shakespeare of the dance"). The ballets of which he was most proud were his La Toilette de Vénus, Les Jalousies du sérail, L'Amour corsaire and Le Jaloux sans rival. Besides the Lettres sur la danse, Noverre wrote Observations sur la construction d'une nouvelle salle de l'Opéra (1781); Lettres sur Garrick écrites à Voltaire (1801); and Lettre à un artiste sur les fêtes publiques (1801).

== Early life and career ==
In 1774 King Louis XV died and Noverre's dear friend Marie-Antoinette became the Queen of France. Marie-Antoinette did not forget about her dear Dance Master, and appointed Noverre to the Paris Opera. This was Noverre's shining moment, but the loyalty and backing of Marie-Antoinette could switch. In 1779 Noverre was unseated from his position because Dauberval, Maximilien Gardel and Mlle Guimard gathered prominent people and poisoned them against Noverre. However, Noverre didn't leave the Opera until 1781. Noverre's fitting effect on the Paris ballet world would be preserved by the production of his tragic ballet Jason et Médée in 1763. In 1787, Pierre Gardel inherited the throne and Paris Opera, and carried out Noverre's ideas on costume and thoughts on ballet pantomime. (Chazin-Bennhaum) He composed Les Caprices de Galathée, for example, and garbed his dancers in tiger skins and shoes made of tree bark. His naturalist attitude towards costume placed him in the front rank of the French Enlightenment.

== Les Lettres sur la danse et sur les ballets ==
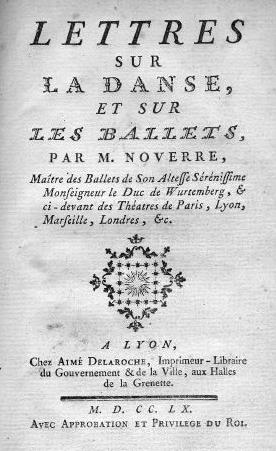
Les Lettres sur la danse et sur les ballets, Lyon 1760

=== Context ===
Noverre's treatise on dancing and theater expressed his aesthetic theories on the production of ballets and his method of teaching ballet. Noverre wrote this text in London in 1756 and published it in 1760 in Lyon, France. He began his research for his essays in Drury Lane, London, where he choreographed for his own troupe of dancers at the Theatre Royal under the direction of David Garrick. It was in David Garrick's library that Noverre read modern French literature and ancient Latin treatises on pantomime. Noverre was inspired by the pantomimes that he thought stirred up the audience's emotions by the use of expressive movement. He proclaimed in his text that ballet should unfold through dramatic movement, and the movement should express the relationship between the characters. Noverre named this type of ballet, ballet d’action or pantomime ballet (International Dictionary of Ballet 1032). From 1757 to 1760, he produced thirteen new works with composer François Granier at the Lyon Opera. His lighter, colorful pantomime ballets like Les Caprices de Galathée, La Toilette de Vénus, and Les Jalousies du sérail, received great success.

=== Inspiration ===
Noverre was most immediately influenced by Jean-Philippe Rameau, David Garrick, and Marie Sallé. Rameau was a very influential French composer and music theorist, and Noverre was inspired by his dance music that combined programmatic and strongly individual elements. David Garrick was an actor and theatre director at the Theatre Royal. Noverre was inspired by his talent for "histrionics" and vivid mime work where Noverre wanted to shake from the traditional forms of Ballet. (The Encyclopedia of Dance and Ballet 695).

With the content that follows it is imperative to closer examine the profound influence of Marie Sallé on Jean-George Noverre. Sallé and Noverre had an intertwining history that began at the Paris Opera Ballet. Sallé had studied in Paris with Françoise Prévost, who was a known predecessor of dramatizing ballet with her virtuosic acting and expressive performance. * Salle had studied in Paris with Francoise Prevost who was an established predecessor of the dramatic style of ballet demonstrated through her virtuosic acting and expressive performances. Sallé made her debut at the Paris Opera in 1727 where she established a reputation for her “delicate grace and expressive mime” abilities.

Sallé's London season of 1733-34 at Covent Garden saw her two pantomimes—Pygmalion and Bacchus and Ariadne—which were both staged in the spring of 1734. Additionally, she collaborated with the naturalised British composer George Frideric Handel during his 1734-35 London Opera season during which her pantomimes became a forerunner of Noverre's ballet d'action--. When she returned to Paris in 1735, she choreographed and danced in scenes for Jean-Philippe Rameau's Opera-ballets. Although she retired from the public stage in 1741, she continued to influence the dance community through her coaching and choreographic innovations at Opéra-Comique in 1743, which happens to be when Noverre made his debut.

Social and economic factors, in what was unequivocally a “man’s world” allowed Noverre to bring forth his ideologies surrounding the evolution of dance. By contrast, the recognition given to Sallé was largely limited to her significance as a performer. Her role as a creative choreographer, and progressive innovator was not only ignored during her lifetime, but it has failed to have been recognized by historians of the dance arts even to this day. Blanked for her virtuosic movements and expressive talents, Sallé laid the foundations for which Noverre was able to move forward. Her choreographic work in Pygmalion brought forth a combination of expressive gestures and dance movements to mediate its narrative. Although historians have grappled with the duality of Sallé's role in dance history, it is precisely these aspects that deem her the true inventor of the ballet d'action that was to sweep the late eighteenth-century stage under Noverre's creative efforts and leadership.

In addition to her performance and choreographic work, Sallé worked to create reforms within the rigid ballet world predating Noverre. Sallé revolutionized ballet by her combination of artistic dance movement, the expressive use of gestures matched to the music, and her redesign of costumes and stage scenery in unique ways that broke new ground in the dance world. The simple act of omitting the Mask and the reworking of costumes was later picked up by Noverre in his Les Lettres sur la danse et sur les ballets. Sallé's shifting public image, influenced the reception of her costume reforms. She was performing at the time when the dancers’ costumes were not realistic. Noverre's notion of costume reform clearly stemmed from his association with her. Although he is recognized for his rejection of the dancer's mask, it is most probable that his action would have been motivated by Sallé's “noble, expressive and spiritual countenance,” which inspired particular comment in his Letter.

Scholars often relate the speed of Noverre's rapid shifts in style to the work Sallé created before him. Operating under the social and gender restrictions of the 18th century, Sallé created and performed her own works, contrasting with the norm of female dancers interpreting pieces made by men. Noverre's innovations can be attributed to the paradigm shifts that grew out of her work.

=== Content ===
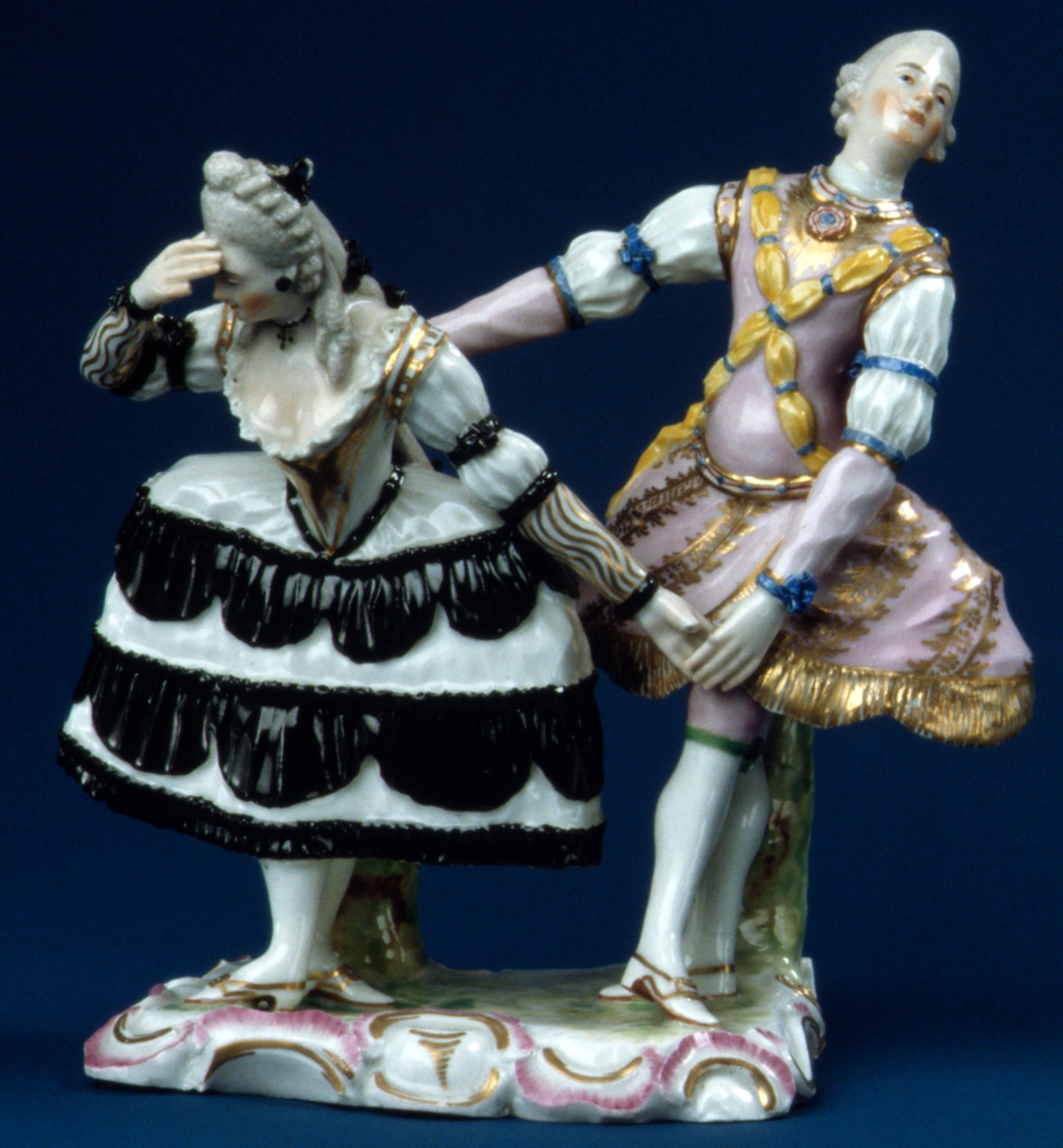
Another Ludwigsburg porcelain group, 1760-63

Noverre's text demanded an end to repressive traditions peculiar to the Paris Opera Ballet, such as stereotypical and cumbersome costumes, and old-fashioned musical styles and choreography. Noverre also discussed the methods for training dancers such as encouraging a student to capitalize on his or her own talents (The Encyclopedia of Dance and Ballet 699). Most of Noverre's criticisms of dance in his book were directed towards the Paris Opera Ballet because he felt the Paris Opera Ballet created ballets that were an isolated event within Opera lacking meaningful connection with the main theme of the Opera. He criticized the Paris Opera Ballet use of the mask because it restricted the dancer from showing facial expressions that could bear meaning on their characters. Noverre devoted the whole of his Ninth Letter to the subject of masks and wrote, " Destroy the masks and" he argued, "we shall gain a soul, and be the best dancers in the world." Noverre specifically dealt with seven major points in his treatise:

1. Regarding the training of dancers, he emphasized that correctness in dance technique as laid down by Pierre Beauchamp and others must be held with sensitivity to the individual's anatomy.
2. Of prime concern, the pedagogical consideration of the dancer's personality and style is prerequisite to artistic development.
3. Noverre stressed that within a dramatic context, validity and sincerity of gestural expression are of the utmost importance in creating a ballet.
4. Noverre called for the logical development of plots. According to Noverre, plots should be thematically integrated with movement. Additionally, all superfluous solos and irrelevant dance techniques should be omitted from the ballet.
5. Noverre was adamant that music be appropriately suited to the dramatic development of the plot.
6. He insisted that costumes, décor, and lighting be compatible with the introduction, plot, and climax of each act within the ballet.
7. With the disappearance of masks in his own ballets, Noverre pronounced his advanced ideas on stage make-up for dancers that would allow for the dancer's expression to be seen rather than hidden behind a mask (Lee 111).

=== Impact ===
Noverre's Les Lettres sur la danse et sur les ballets had lasting impact on ballet ideology as his text has been printed in almost every European language and his name is one of the most frequently quoted in the literature of dance (Lynham 13). Many of his theories have been implemented in dance classes today and remain a part today's ideology of dance. For example, his idea that a teacher should encourage students to profit from his or her own talents rather than to imitate a teacher or the style of a popular dancer is a present ideology of dance. Noverre did receive criticism from many of his prominent ballet contemporaries, however his theories have survived longer than any of his ballets, which have not been reproduced for at least two centuries (Lynham 127).

=== Lettres sur la Danse in English ===
Lettres sur la danse was first published in English in 1782, where it was titled The Works of Monsieur Noverre translated from the French. The translator, Parkyns MacMahon, also translated Noverre's ballet Adela of Ponthieu, and was in touch with him while working on The Works of Monsieur Noverre. In 2014, MacMahon's translation was transcribed with commentary by Michael Burden and Jennifer Thorp, and published with eight essays by dance historians and musicologists as The Works of Monsieur Noverre Translated from the French: Noverre, His Circle, and the English Lettres sur la Danse (Hillsdale, New York: Pendragon, 2014). Although snippets appear in Letters on Dancing and Ballets (London: Beaumont, 1930), by Cyril Beaumont, the Burden and Thorp transcription is the only complete English translation.

The essays in the volume, which cover a number of aspects of Noverre's life and career in depth are as follows: Jennifer Thorp: From Les fêtes chinoises to Agamemnon revenged: Ange Goudar as commentator on the ballets of Jean-Georges Noverre; Samantha Owens: "Just as great as Noverre": the ballet composer Florian Johann Deller (1729–73) and music at the Württemberg court; Kathleen Kuzmick Hansell: Noverre in Milan: a turning point; Adeline Mueller: A peep into Mozart and Le Picq's Serraglio (Milan, 1772): Noverre's tragic reworking of a comic ballet; Edward Nye: Outrageous dancing and respectable Noverre; Bruce Alan Brown: Weiß und Rosenfarb: the end of Noverrian ballet in Vienna and the beginnings of the Wienerischer Musenalmanach; Michael Burden: Regular meetings: Noverre and Gallini in London, 1756-1795; Anna Karin Ståhle: Jean-Georges Noverre applying for jobs.

== The Jean-Georges Noverre bicentenary ==
To mark the bicentenary of the death of Jean-Georges Noverre, two academic meetings were held which explored aspects of biography, dance, and performance.

The first was ‘Celebrating Jean-Georges Noverre 1727-1810: his world, and beyond’, which was the 11th Annual Oxford Dance Symposium on 16–17 April 2010 at New College, Oxford. Some of the papers were included in Burden and Thorp (2014).

The second was the ‘Colloque International à l’occasion du bicentenaire de la mort de Noverre’, les jeudi 21, vendredi 22 et samedi 23 octobre 2010, A l’initiative de L’Association pour un Centre de recherches sur les Arts du spectacle aux XVIIe et XVIIIe siècles (ACRAS, société savante), at Centre National de la Danse, 1 rue Victor Hugo – 93500 Pantin, and Maison de la Recherche, 28 rue Serpente, 75006 Paris. The proceedings were published in the Revue Musicorum, X. Accueil

== Major works ==
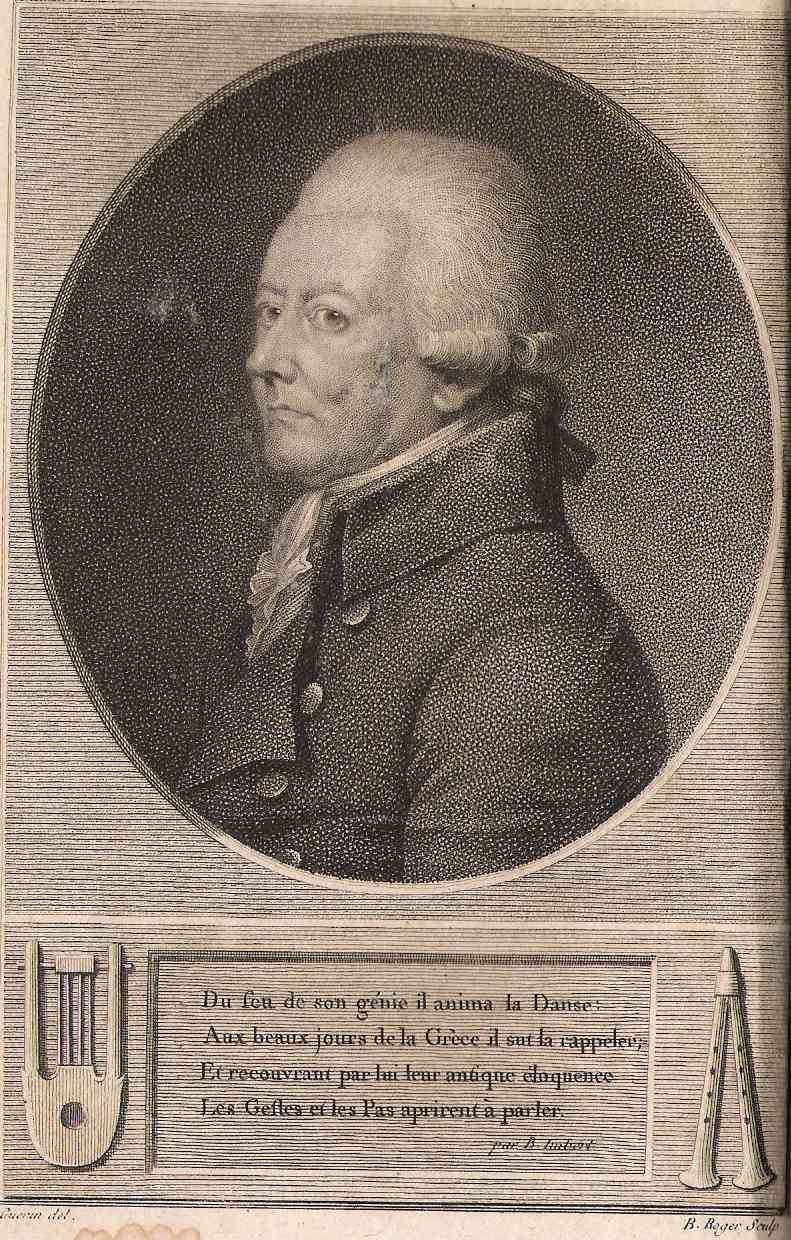
Noverre: frontispiece of Lettres sur les arts imitateurs, Paris, Collin, The Hague, Immerzeel, 1807

- Les Fêtes Chinoises (Paris 1754) (mus. Jean-Philippe Rameau)
- La Fontaine de jouvence (Paris 1754)
- La Toilette de Vénus (Lyon 1757) (mus. François Granet)
- L'Impromptu du sentiment (Lyon 1758)
- La Mort d'Ajax (Lyon 1758) (mus. François Granet)
- Alceste (Stuttgart 1761Wien 1767) (mus. Christoph Willibald Gluck)
- La Mort d'Hercule (Stuttgart 1762)
- Psyché et l'Amour (Stuttgart 1762) (mus. Jean-Joseph Rodolphe)
- Jason et Médée (Stuttgart 1763 – Wien 1767 – Paris 1776 e 1780 – London 1781) (mus. Jean-Joseph Rodolphe)
- Hypermnestre (Stuttgart 1764)
- Diane et Endymion (Wien 1770)
- Don Chisciotte, alle nozze di Gamace (Wien 1772) (mus. Antonio Salieri)
- Le Judgement de Pâris (Wien 1771)
- Roger et Bradamante (Wien 1771)
- Agamemnon vengé (Wien 1772)
- Iphigénie en Tauride (Wien 1772) (mus. Christoph Willibald Gluck)
- Thésée (Wien 1772)
- Acis et Galathée (Wien 1773)
- Adèle de Ponthieu (Wien 1773 – London 1782)
- Alexandre et Campaspe de Larisse (Wien 1773)
- Les Horaces et les Curiaces (Wien 1774 – Paris 1777)
- Renaud et Armide (Milan 1775 – London 1782)
- Apelle et Campaspe (Paris 1776 – Lyon 1787)
- Les Caprices de Galatée (Paris 1776 – London 1789)
- Annette et Lubin (Paris 1778)
- Les petits riens (Paris 1778) (mus. Wolfgang Amadeus Mozart)
- Les Amours d'Énée et de Didon (Lyon 1781)
- La Fête du Sérail (Paris 1788)
- L'Amour et Psyché (London 1788) (mus. Jean-Joseph Rodolphe)
- La Fête de Tempé (London 1788)
- Admète (London 1789)
- La Bergère des Alpes (London 1794)
- La Vittoria (London 1794)
- Windsor Castle (London 1795)

== See also ==
- Eugène Hus
