= Botta =

Botta is an Italian surname. People with this surname can be found in Italy and the Italian diaspora, but also among Telugu people. Notable people with the surname include:

- Antonio Botta (1896–1969), Argentine-Brazilian dramatist and screenwriter
- Antoniotto Botta Adorno (1688–1774), Italian-born diplomat in the service of Austria;
- Alejandro Meloño Botta (born 1977), football player from Uruguay;
- Anne C. Lynch Botta (1815–1891), American poet and teacher;
- Bergonzio Botta (c.1454–1504), Italian politician who played a formative role in ballet;
- Carlo Giuseppe Guglielmo Botta (1766–1837), Italian historian;
- Dan Botta (1907–1958), Romanian poet, essayist, and far right activist;
- Emil Botta (1911–1977), Romanian poet, essayist and actor;
- Luca Botta (1882–1917), Italian opera singer;
- Mario Botta (born 1943), Swiss architect;
- Miguel Ángel Botta (1941–2019), Argentine boxer;
- Rubén Botta (born 1990), Argentine footballer;
- Paul-Émile Botta or Paolo Emiliano Botta (1802–1870), Italian-French archaeologist and naturalist;
- Renee Botta, Chair of the Department of Media, Film & Journalism Studies at the University of Denver;
- Santiago García Botta (born 1992), Argentine rugby union player;
- Stefano Botta (born 1986), Italian football midfielder;
- Vincenzo Botta (1818–1894), Italian-born politician and professor of philosophy.

== See also ==
- Botta, a fictional character in the video game Tales of Symphonia
- Bottas
- BOTA (disambiguation)
