= Botas =

Botas or BOTAS may refer to:

== Places ==
- Botas River, a river in Brazil

== People ==
- Juan Rodríguez Botas, impressionist painter

== Other uses ==
- BOTAŞ, a crude oil and natural gas pipeline and trading company in Turkey
- Botas (company), a Czech shoe and sportswear manufacturer
- Botaş SK, a Turkish sports club known for its women's basketball team

== See also ==
- Bottas
- BOTA (disambiguation)
