= Bota (disambiguation) =

Bota is a municipality in Perak Tengah District, Perak, Malaysia.

Bota or BOTA may also refer to:

== Places ==
- Isla Bota, an island in the Gulf of California
- Bridge of the Americas (El Paso–Ciudad Juárez) Mexico-USA
- Bota, Bacău County, Romania; a village in Ungureni, Bacău
- Bota (state constituency), state constituency in Perak, Malaysia

== People ==
- Alice Bota (born 1979) German journalist
- Alin Bota (born 1983) Romanian soccer goalkeep
- Kinga Bóta (born 1977) Hungarian sprint canoer
- Theodor Botă (born 1997) Romanian soccer player
- Jean-Chrysostome Raharison (born 1979) nicknamed "Bota"; Malagasy soccer player

== Other uses ==
- Builders of the Adytum (B.O.T.A.), a Western spirituality society based in Los Angeles, California, USA
  - B.O.T.A. tarot deck
- Bota bag, a style of Spanish wineskin
- Bota (film) 2014 Albanian drama film
- "B.O.T.A. (Baddest of Them All)", song by British musician Eliza Rose
- Bota (Βότα), Byzantine name for the Roman festival of Vota publica

== See also ==
- Botta (surname)
- Botas (disambiguation)
