= Somorjai =

Somorjai (Somorjay) is a Hungarian surname. Notable people with the surname include:

- Enikő Somorjai (born 1981), Hungarian ballet dancer
- Gábor A. Somorjai (1935–2025), Hungarian-born American chemist
- Tamás Somorjai (born 1980), Hungarian football player
