= Bottas (surname) =

Bottas is a surname. Notable people with the surname include:

- Emilia Bottas (now Pikkarainen; born 1992) Finnish swimmer, Valtteri's ex-wife
- Valtteri Bottas (born 1989) Finnish Formula One driver, Emilia's ex-husband

== See also ==
- Botta, a surname
- Botas (disambiguation)
