= Enikő Somorjai =

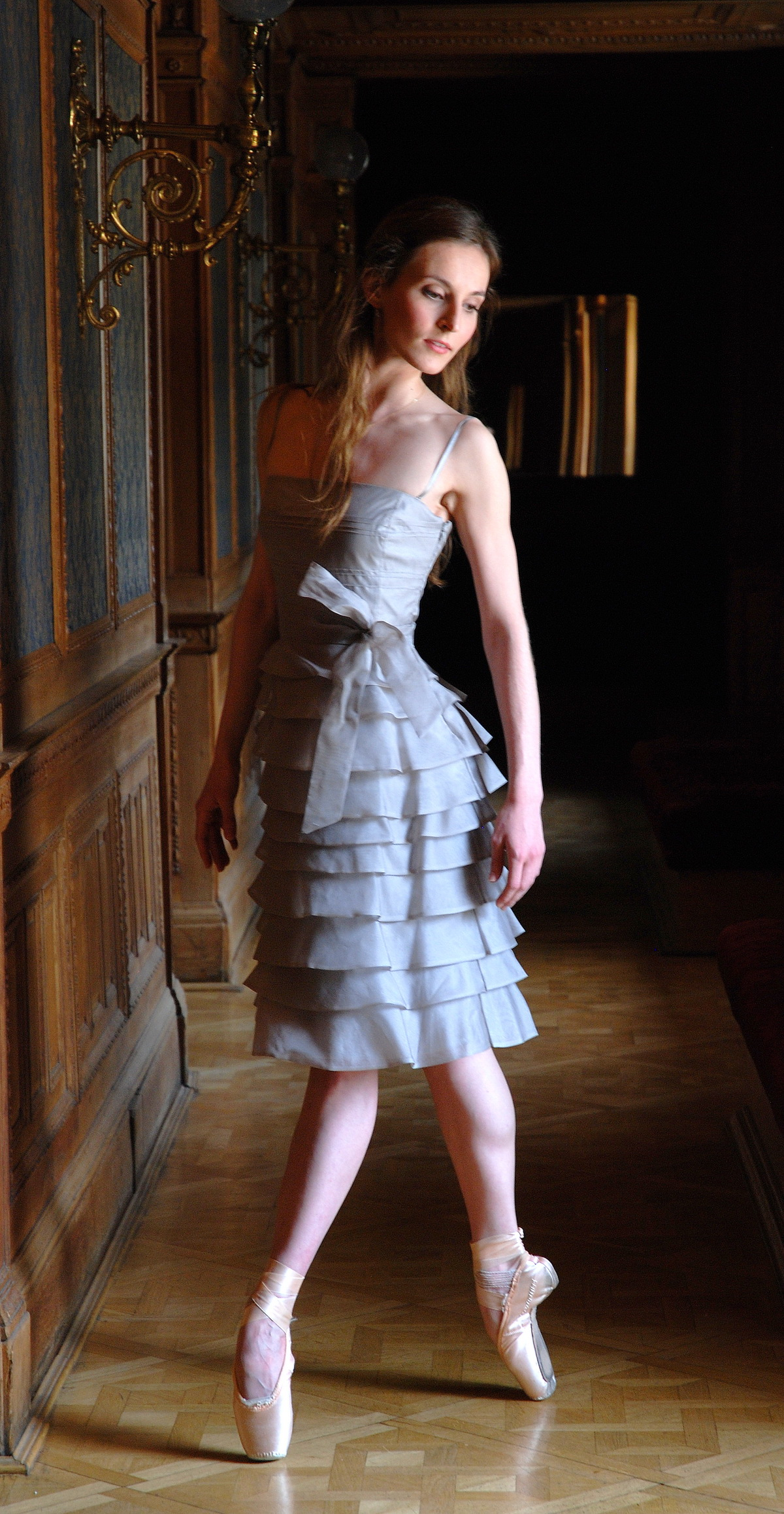
Somorjai in 2008

Enikő Somorjai (born November 17, 1981) is a soloist dancer with the Hungarian National Ballet in Hungarian State Opera House. Born in Budapest, Hungary, she began dancing at the age of four. She took her degree in 2001 at Hungarian Dance Academy. Prior to becoming a soloist, she was in the Company corps de ballet. She has danced in many ballets including The Nutcracker (Sugar Plum Fairy), Swan Lake (Odette/Odile), The Wooden Prince (Princess), Giselle and many others.

== Awards and honours ==
In 1997 Somorjai won the gold medal at the Győr International Ballet Competition and the third place at Vienna International Ballet Competition in 1999.
