= Jozefa Ellinger =

Hungarian opera singer (1852–1920)

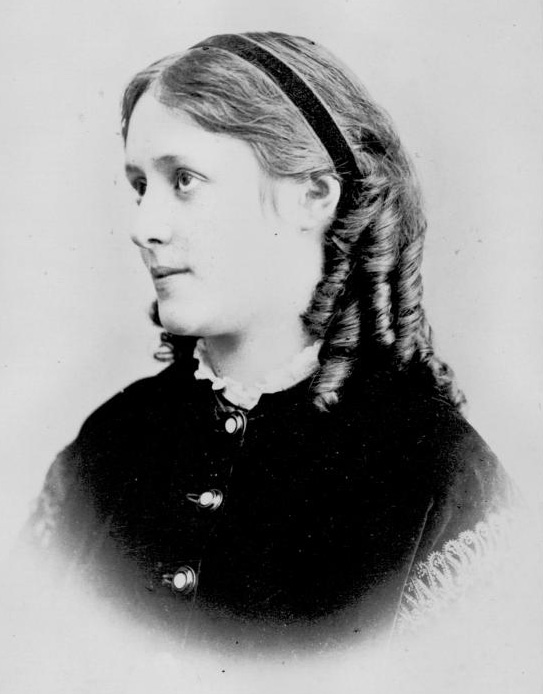
- Born: 25 May 1852; Budapest
- Died: April 11, 1920 (aged 67); Budapest
- Occupation: opera singer

Jozefa Ellinger (Hungarian: Ellinger Józsefa, or Josepha; German: Jozefa); (25 May 1852 Budapest – 11 April 1920, Budapest) was a Hungarian opera singer (coloratura soprano).

== Life ==
She was the daughter of opera singers József Ellinger and Therese Engst, the wife of opera singer Vilmos Malecky, and the mother of opera singers Bianca Malecka and Oskar Malecky. she studied with her parents.her debut took place in 1872 in Budapest at a concert conducted by Franz Liszt. From 1874 to 1885, she was a member of the Hungarian State Opera House, then sang for several seasons at the Budapest Court Opera. Performing leading roles in operas by Ferenc Erkel and Franz Doppler, she also successfully performed works by Mozart and Wagner. She toured Berlin, Cologne, Leipzig, and Dresden.

== Retired ==
From 1892, she taught; she retired in 1913.
