= Anne Lynch Botta =

American poet and socialite (1815–1891)

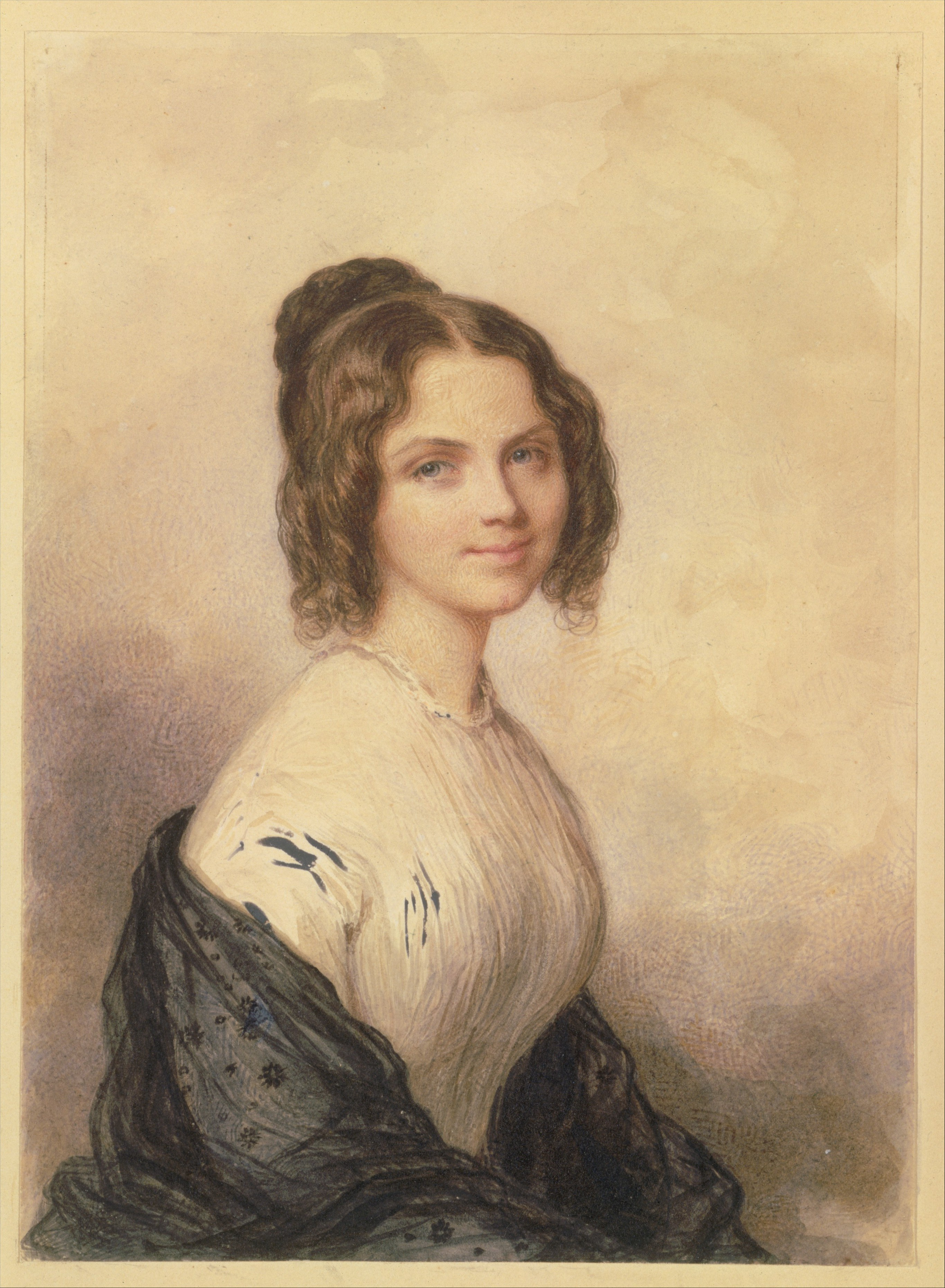
- Painting of Anne C. Lynch Botta, c. 1847
- Born: Anne Charlotte Lynch; November 11, 1815; Bennington, Vermont, US
- Died: March 23, 1891 (aged 75); New York City, US
- Occupations: Writer; poet; socialite
- Spouse: Vincenzo Botta

Anne Lynch Botta (November 11, 1815 – March 23, 1891) was an American poet, writer, teacher and socialite whose home was the central gathering place of the literary elite of her era.

== Biography ==
=== Early life ===
She was born Anne Charlotte Lynch in Bennington, Vermont. Her father was Patrick Lynch (died 1819), of Dublin, Ireland, who took part in the United Irishmen Rebellion of 1798. For this, he was imprisoned and then banished from Ireland. He came to the United States at the age of 18, eventually making his way to Bennington where he set up a dry-goods business, and where he met his future wife, Charlotte Gray (1789-1873), daughter of Revolutionary War veteran Lt. Col. Ebenezer Gray (1743-1795). Patrick Lynch and Charlotte Gray married in 1812. Along with their daughter Anne, they had a son, Thomas Rawson Lynch (1813-1845).

Lynch's father died in 1819, shipwrecked off the coast of Puerto Principe, in the West Indies. After the death of her father, the family moved to Hartford, Connecticut, where Anne and her brother were sent to the best schools. When she was sixteen she was sent to the Albany Female Academy, where she graduated with high honors in 1834 and stayed there as a teacher for a few years.

=== Literary society ===
She moved to Providence, Rhode Island with her mother in 1838, where she continued to teach. In 1841, she compiled and edited "The Rhode Island Book", a collection of poems and verse from the best regional writers of the time, including two poems of her own. She also began to invite these writers to her home for her evening receptions. It was said in 1843, that "the very best literary society of Providence could be found in the parlor of Miss Lynch".

In 1845, Lynch met the famed actress Fanny Kemble, who became very attached to her and introduced her to a wider circle of literary friends". In the same year she moved to Manhattan with her mother. She began teaching English composition at the Brooklyn Academy for Young Ladies; she continued her writing and was published in periodicals such as the New-York Mirror, The Gift, the Diadem, Home Journal, and the Democratic Review. In New York, she also continued her literary receptions which she held every Saturday evening. It was at one of these receptions that she introduced the unknown Edgar Allan Poe to the literary society of New York. In 1848, her book "Poems" by Anne C. Lynch, was published by George P. Putnam. Edgar Allan Poe said of her: "She is chivalric, self-sacrificing, equal to any fate, capable even of martyrdom, in whatever should seem to her a holy cause. She has a hobby, and this is, the idea of duty."

Anne Lynch lived in Washington DC from 1850 to 1853, while serving as the personal secretary to Senator Henry Clay.

=== Marriage ===
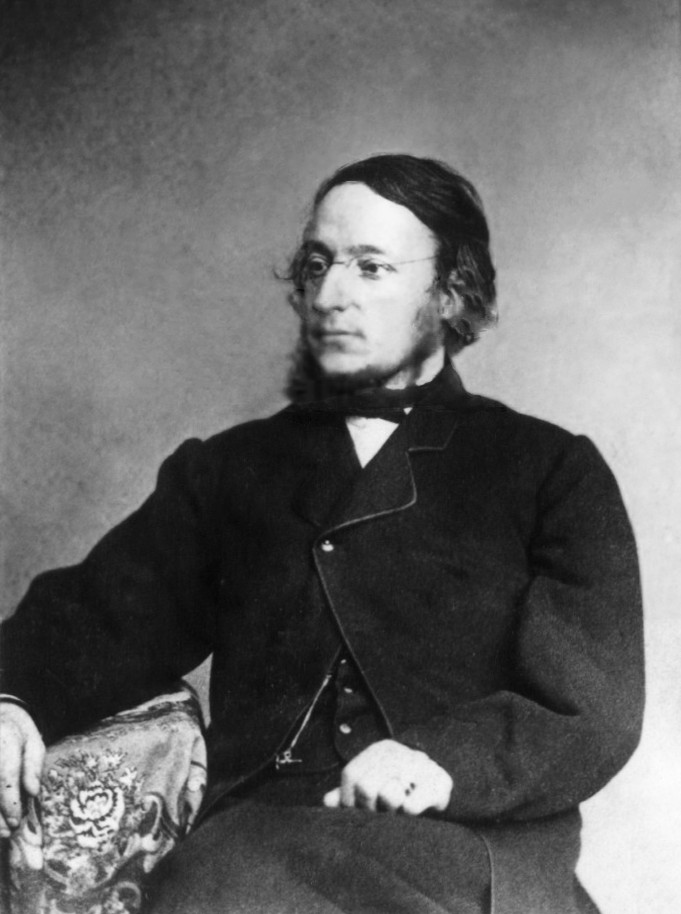
Vincenzo Botta, circa 1860

Lynch traveled to Europe in 1853, where she met Vincenzo Botta, an Italian professor of philosophy in Turin. They married in 1855. Mrs. Botta told an intimate friend of her marriage, "it satisfied her judgement, pleased her fancy, and, above all, filled her heart".

=== Evening receptions ===
For many years she was a well-known and popular leader in society. She hosted intellectual gatherings at her home on West 37th Street. Unlike other salons, which had more to do with seeing and being seen by the high society of New York, her receptions provided a creative space in which artists could meet and collaborate. It was said of her salons that no one was either neglected or treated like a celebrity, and every one went away feeling stimulated, refreshed, and happy. At Mrs. Botta's receptions every Saturday night, attendees would find the most well-known writers, actors and artists, such as Poe, Margaret Fuller, Ralph Waldo Emerson, Amos Bronson Alcott, Louisa May Alcott, Horace Greeley, Richard Henry Stoddard, Andrew Carnegie, Mary Mapes Dodge, Julia Ward Howe, Charles Butler, Fitz-Greene Halleck, Delia Bacon, Grace Greenwood, Bayard Taylor, William Cullen Bryant, Helen Hunt Jackson, actress Fanny Kemble, Daniel Webster, and many more. Her friend Kate Sanborn started her literary lecturing career at these receptions. Said a Boston writer: "It was not so much what Mrs. Botta did for literature with her own pen, as what she helped others to do, that will make her name a part of the literary history of the country."

== Later life ==
In 1860, Mrs. Botta published the Handbook of Universal Literature, which contained concise accounts of authors and their work. She wrote: "This work was begun many years ago, as a literary exercise, to meet the personal requirements of the writer." This book was used as a text book in many educational institutions.

She was also a sculptor of portrait busts. Her sculpture of Charles Butler, done in marble, was donated to New York University. She said: "Beauty in art, in my opinion, does not consist in simply copying nature, but in retaining the true features of the subject, and breathing on them a breath of spiritual life, which should bring them up to their ideal form."

An example of her poetry which showed her interest in literature:

IN THE LIBRARY

Speak low, tread softly through these halls;
Here genius lives enshrined,
Here reign, in silent majesty,

The monarchs of the mind.
A mighty spirit-host they come
From every age and clime;

Above the buried wrecks of years
They breast the tide of Time.
And In their presence-chamber here

They hold their regal state,
And round them throng a noble train,
The gifted and the great.

Anne Charlotte Botta died of pneumonia at age 75. She is buried at the Woodlawn Cemetery in New York.

Mrs. Botta refused to write an autobiography, so after her death, her husband collected correspondence, poems, and biographical information and had a book published, in 1893, called the Memoirs of Anne C. L. Botta: Written by Her Friends. A quote by her friend, Mrs. L Runkle: "Life was the material with which she wrought." One of her noteworthy legacies is a quinquennial prize of $1,000 she founded at the Académie Française for the best essay on "The Condition of Woman." She also promoted the establishment of Barnard College.
