= Pikkarainen =

Pikkarainen is a Finnish surname. Notable people with the surname include:

- Tommi Pikkarainen (born 1969), Finnish football manager and former player
- Kimmo Pikkarainen (born 1976), Finnish professional ice hockey defenceman
- Ilkka Pikkarainen (born 1981), Finnish ice hockey right winger
- Hannu Pikkarainen (born 1983), Finnish professional ice hockey defenceman
- Emilia Pikkarainen (born 1992), Finnish swimmer
- Juhani Pikkarainen (born 1998), Finnish footballer
