= History of ballet =

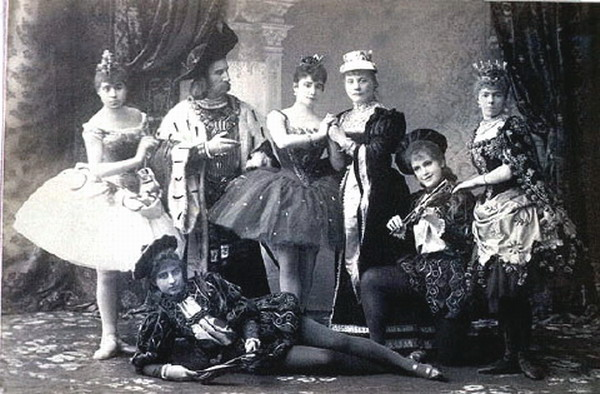
A publicity photo for the premiere of Tchaikovsky's ballet The Sleeping Beauty (1890).

Ballet is a formalized Italian dance form with its origins in the Italian Renaissance courts of 15th and 16th centuries. Ballet spread from Italy to France with the help of Catherine de' Medici, where ballet developed even further under her aristocratic influence. An early example of Catherine's development of ballet is through 'Le Paradis d' Amour', a piece of work presented at the wedding of her daughter Marguerite de Valois to Henry of Navarre. Aristocratic money was responsible for the initial stages of development in 'court ballet', as it was royal money that dictated the ideas, literature and music used in ballets that were created to primarily entertain the aristocrats of the time. The first formal 'court ballet' ever recognized was staged in 1573, 'Ballet des Polonais'. In true form of royal entertainment, 'Ballet des Polonais' was commissioned by Catherine de' Medici to honor the Polish ambassadors who were visiting Paris upon the accession of Henry of Anjou to the throne of Poland. In 1581, Catherine de' Medici commissioned another court ballet, Ballet Comique de la Reine. However, it was her compatriot, Balthasar de Beaujoyeulx, who organized the ballet. Catherine de' Medici and Balthasar de Beaujoyeulx were responsible for presenting the first court ballet ever to apply the principles of Baif's Academie, by integrating poetry, dance, music and set design to convey a unified dramatic storyline. Moreover, the early organization and development of 'court ballet' was funded by, influenced by and produced by the aristocrats of the time, fulfilling both their personal entertainment and political propaganda needs.

In the late 17th century Louis XIV founded the Académie Royale de Musique (the Paris Opera) within which emerged the first professional theatrical ballet company, the Paris Opera Ballet. The predominance of French in the vocabulary of ballet reflects this history. Theatrical ballet soon became an independent form of art, although still frequently maintaining a close association with opera, and spread from the heart of Europe to other nations. The Royal Danish Ballet and the Imperial Ballet of the Russian Empire were founded in the 1740s and began to flourish, especially after about 1850. In 1907 the Russian ballet in turn moved back to France, where the Ballets Russes of Sergei Diaghilev and its successors were particularly influential. Soon ballet spread around the world with the formation of new companies, including London's The Royal Ballet (1931), the San Francisco Ballet (1933), American Ballet Theatre (1937), the Royal Winnipeg Ballet (1939), The Australian Ballet (1940 as the predecessor Borovansky Ballet), the New York City Ballet (1948), the Cuban National Ballet (1948), the National Ballet of Canada (1951), and the National Ballet Academy and Trust of India (2002).

In the 20th century styles of ballet continued to develop and strongly influence broader concert dance, for example, in the United States choreographer George Balanchine developed what is now known as neoclassical ballet, subsequent developments have included contemporary ballet and post-structural ballet, for example seen in the work of William Forsythe in Germany.

The etymology of the word "ballet" reflects its history. The word ballet comes from French and was borrowed into English around the 17th century. The French word in turn has its origins in Italian balletto, a diminutive of ballo (dance). Ballet ultimately traces back to Italian ballare, meaning "to dance".

== Origins ==
=== Renaissance – Italy and France ===
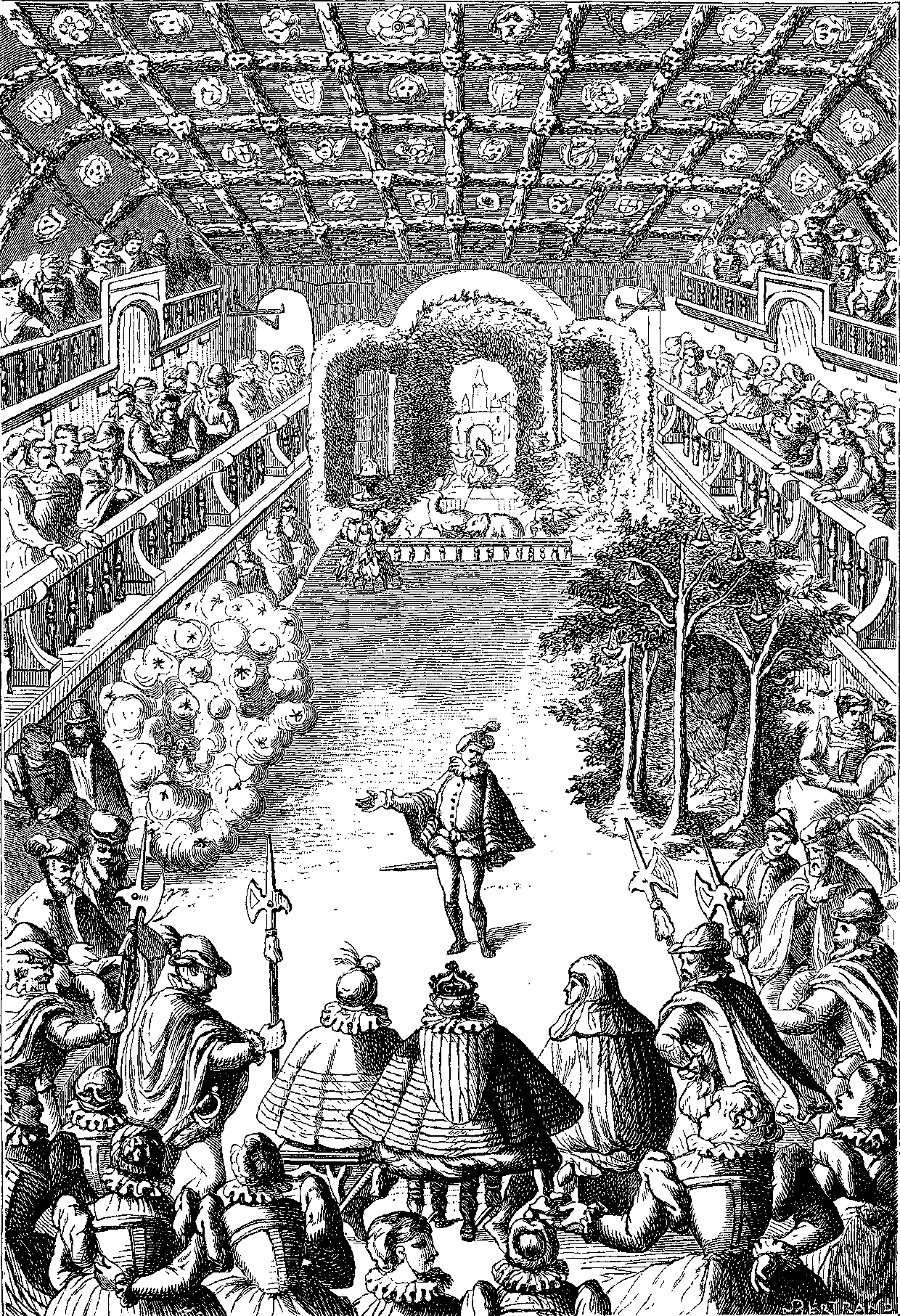
Engraving of the second scene of the Ballet Comique de la Reine, staged in Paris in 1581 for the French court.

Ballet originated in the Renaissance court as an outgrowth of court pageantry in Italy, where aristocratic weddings were lavish celebrations. Tutus, ballet slippers and pointe work were not yet used. The choreography was adapted from court dance steps. Performers dressed in fashions of the times. For women that meant formal gowns that covered their legs to the ankle. Early ballet was participatory, with the audience joining the dance towards the end.

Domenico da Piacenza (c. 1400–c. 1470) was one of the first dancing masters. Along with his students, Antonio Cornazzano and Guglielmo Ebreo da Pesaro, he was trained in dance and responsible for teaching nobles the art. Da Piacenza left one work: De arte saltandi et choreus ducendi (On the art of dancing and conducting dances), which was put together by his students.

In 1489, Galeazzo, Duke of Milan, married Isabella of Aragon in Tortona. An elaborate dance entertainment was arranged for the celebrations by the Italian dance master Bergonzio Botta. The dances were linked by a slim narrative concerning Jason and the Argonauts, and each corresponded to a different course for the dinner. Tristano Calco of Milan wrote about the event, and it was considered so impressive, that many similar spectacles were organized elsewhere.

Ballet was further shaped by the French ballet de cour, which consisted of social dances performed by the nobility in tandem with music, speech, verse, song, pageant, decor and costume. When Catherine de' Medici, an Italian aristocrat with an interest in the arts, married the French crown heir Henry II, she brought her enthusiasm for dance to France and provided financial support. Catherine's glittering entertainments supported the aims of court politics and usually were organized around mythological themes. The first ballet de cour was the Ballet de Polonais. This Ballet was performed in 1573 on the occasion of the visit of the Polish Ambassador. It was choreographed by Balthasar de Beaujoyeulx and featured an hour-long dance for sixteen women, each representing a French province. Ballet Comique de la Reine (1581), which was also choreographed and directed by Balthasar de Beaujoyeulx, was commissioned by Louise of Lorraine, queen consort of King Henry III, son of Catherine, to celebrate the marriage of Henry's favorite the Duke de Joyeuse to Marguerite de Lorraine, the sister of Queen Louise. The ballet lasted for more than five hours and was danced by twenty-four dancers: twelve naiades and twelve pages.

In the same year, the publication of Fabritio Caroso's Il Ballarino, a technical manual on court dancing, both performance and social, helped to establish Italy as a centre of technical ballet development.

=== 17th century – France and Court Dance ===
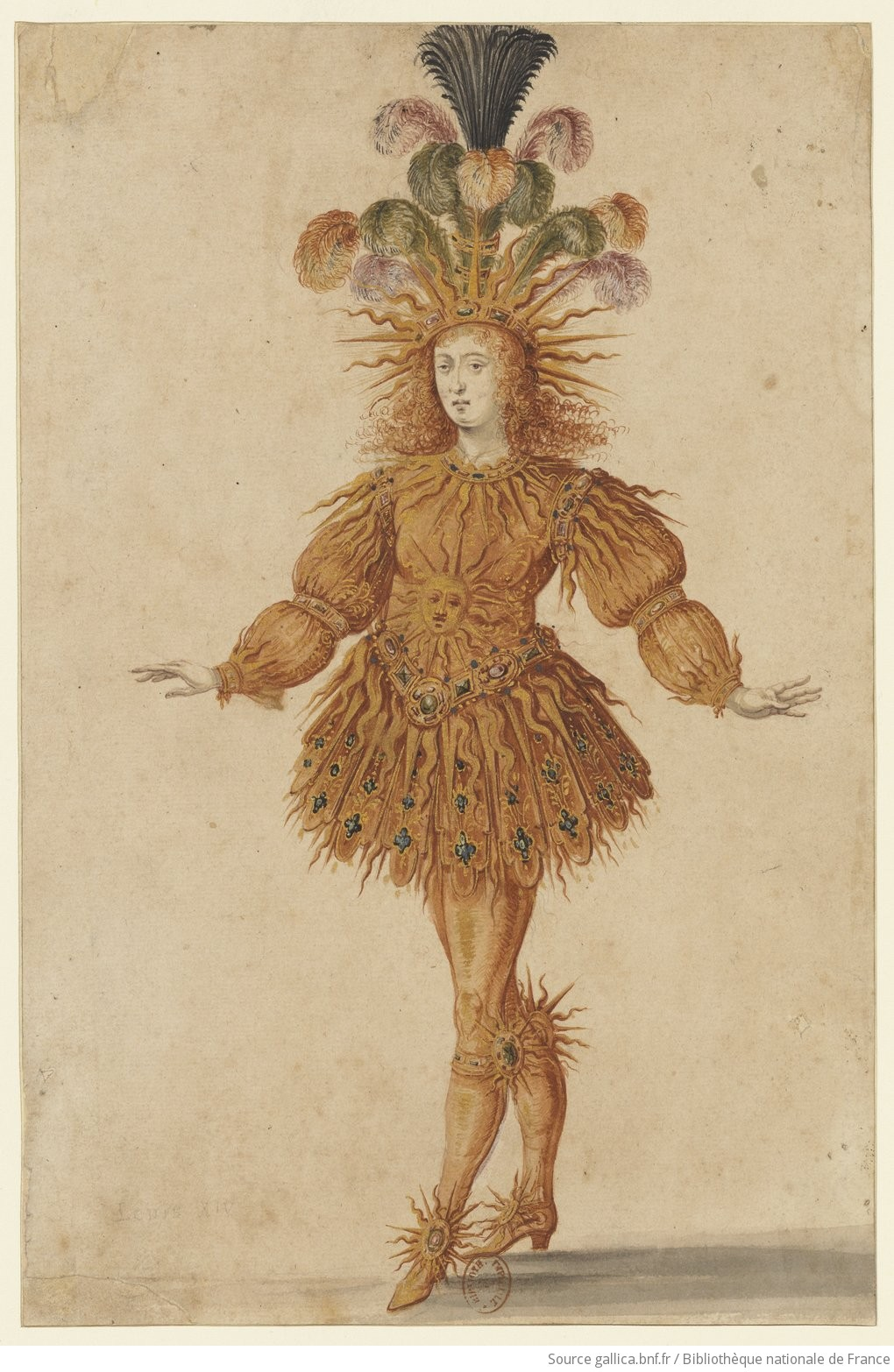
Louis XIV in Lully's Ballet Royal de la Nuit (1653).

Ballet developed as a performance-focused art form in France during the reign of Louis XIV, who was passionate about dance. His interest in ballet dancing was politically motivated. He established strict social etiquettes through dancing and turned it into one of the most crucial elements in court social life, effectively holding authority over the nobles and reigning over the state. Louis's initiates led to the refinement and perfection of social dancing among aristocrats as a way to display royalty, further consolidating the art of classical ballet with newly established rules and protocols.

In 1661 Louis XIV, determined to further his ambition in controlling the nobles and reverse a decline in dance standards that began in the 17th century, established the Académie Royale de Danse. Before that, aristocrats considered dancing, together with riding and military training as three major disciplines in showcasing their nobility. Nonetheless, Louis' founding of the academy diverted their attention from military arts to court social functions, from war to ballet, further tightening rules around them.

To expand the influence of French culture throughout Europe, Louis ordered Pierre Beauchamp, the king's personal dance teacher and favorite partner in ballet de cour in the 1650s, to create "a way of making dance understood on paper". Beauchamp was also appointed Intendant des ballets du roi and in 1680 became the director of the dance academy, a position he held until 1687. This order led to an intense research in this area by many ballet masters, however, only Beauchamp's dance notation system got recognized. In his system, he codified the five basic positions of the feet in ballet. Raoul Auger Feuillet, a Parisian ballet master, later adopted his system and had his work published in 1700. His notation system became significantly popular in Europe.

Feuillet concentrated his efforts on the most influencing dance at court, called "La belle danse", or also known as "The French noble style". This kind of dance was popular at balls or courts with more demanding skills. "Entrée grave", as one of la belle danse's highest form, was typically performed by one man or two men with graceful and dignified movements, followed by slow and elegant music. At this time, it's only men that performed la belle danse and entrée grave. Women did perform at queen's ballets and other social occasions, but not at entrée grave, king's ballets, at courts or on Paris' stages, not until 1680s. During this particular time, men were considered to be the champion and master of art, displaying their masculine, dignified and noble dance, a king's dance. This also set the model for classical ballet.

Court ballets had a long history of combining dance and etiquette since the Renaissance, but when it came to la belle danse, etiquettes in ballet were brought to a completely new height. Every single etiquette rule in Louis' courts was put in great detail in la belle danse and one could certainly see others' noble status through their dances. Five positions of the bodies codified by Beauchamp, followed by Feuillet, described the body like a miniature court, with the head as the central point, coordinating its limbs like the king ruling his state. A dancer performing a genuine noble would perform different five positions than one performing a peasant or lower-ranking characters. Proof of nobility was also indicated through use of masks, makeup, costumes especially shoes in la belle danse.

Jean-Baptiste Lully, an Italian violinist, dancer, choreographer, and composer, who joined the court of Louis XIV in 1652, played a significant role in establishing the general direction ballet would follow for the next century. Supported and admired by King Louis XIV, Lully often cast the king in his ballets. The title of Sun King for the French monarch, originated in Louis XIV's role in Lully's Ballet de la Nuit (1653). The fourteen-year-old Louis XIV danced five roles in this 12-hour ballet. This Ballet was lavish and featured a scene where a set piece of a house was burned down, included witches, werewolves, gypsies, shepherds, thieves, and the goddesses Venus and Diana. The ballet's main theme was not darkness and night terrors though, but its focus was on Louis who appeared at the end as the Sun (the Sun God, Apollo), putting an end to the night. Lully's main contribution to ballet were his nuanced compositions. His understanding of movement and dance allowed him to compose specifically for ballet, with musical phrasings that complemented physical movements. Lully also collaborated with the French playwright Molière. Together, they took an Italian theatre style, the commedia dell'arte, and adapted it into their work for a French audience, creating the comédie-ballet. Among their greatest productions, with Beauchamp as the choreographer, was Le Bourgeois Gentilhomme (1670).

In 1669 Louis XIV founded the Académie d'Opéra with Pierre Perrin as director. Louis XIV retired as a dancer in 1670, largely because of excessive weight gain. Earlier, in 1661 he had founded a school, the Adacemie Royale de danse. Beauchamp was the first ballet-master of the Opéra and created the dances for the new company's first production Pomone with music by Robert Cambert. Later, after Perrin went bankrupt, the king reestablished the Opéra as the Académie royale de Musique and made Lully the director. Beauchamp was one of the principal choreographers. In this position Lully, with his librettist Philippe Quinault, created a new genre, the tragédie en musique, each act of which featured a divertissement that was a miniature ballet scene. With almost all his important creations Jean-Baptiste Lully brought together music and drama with Italian and French dance elements. His work created a legacy which would define the future of ballet.

=== Popularity throughout Europe ===
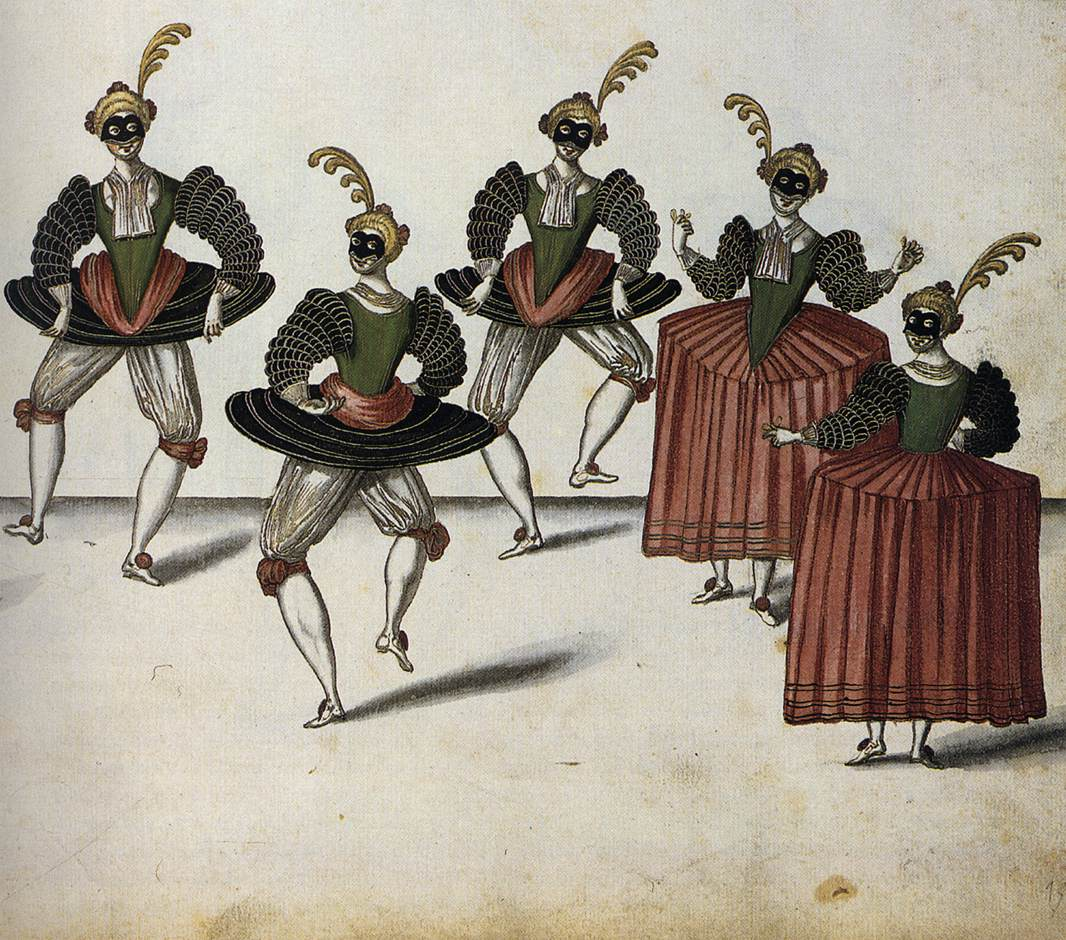
The Royal Ballet of the Dowager of Bilbao's Grand Ball, 1626.

France's court was in some ways the leading source of fashionable culture for many other royal courts in Europe. Styles of entertainment were imitated, including the royal ballets. Courts in Spain, Portugal, Poland, Germany, and elsewhere all became audiences and participants in ballets. In addition to France, Italy became an important influence on the art form, predominantly Venice.

Professional ballet troupes began to organize and tour Europe, performing for aristocratic audiences. In Poland, King Władysław IV Vasa (1633–1648) hosted Italian opera productions, which included ballet performers in some scenes. The famous European ballet-masters who worked for the Polish court include Jean Favier, Antoine Pitrot, Antonio Sacco and Francesco Caselli.

== 18th century ==
=== France and development as an art form ===
The 18th century was a period of advancement in the technical standards of ballet and the period when ballet became a serious dramatic art form on par with the opera. Central to this advance was the seminal work of Jean-Georges Noverre, Lettres sur la danse et les ballets (1760), which focused on developing the ballet d'action, in which the movements of the dancers are designed to express character and assist in the narrative. Noverre believed that: ballet should be technical but also move the audience emotionally, plots need to be unified, the scenery and music need to support the plot and be unified within the story, and that pantomime needs to be simple and understandable.

Reforms were made in ballet composition by composers such as Christoph Willibald Gluck. Finally, ballet was divided into three formal techniques sérieux, demi-caractère and comique. Ballet also began to be featured in operas as interludes called divertissements.

=== Outside France ===
Venice continued to be a centre of dance in Europe, particularly during the Venice Carnival, when dancers and visitors from across the continent would travel to the city for a lively cultural exchange. The city's Teatro San Benedetto became a famous landmark largely due to the ballets performed there. Italian ballet techniques remained the dominant influence in much of southern and eastern Europe until Russian techniques supplanted them in the early 20th century.

Ballet performances spread to Eastern Europe during the 18th century, into areas such as Hungary, where they were held in private theatres at aristocratic castles. Professional companies were established that performed throughout Hungary and also toured abroad. The Budapest National Theatre increasingly serving a role as a home for the dancers.

Some of the leading dancers of the time who performed throughout Europe were Louis Dupré, Charles Le Picque with Anna Binetti, Gaetano Vestris, and Jean-Georges Noverre.

== 19th century ==
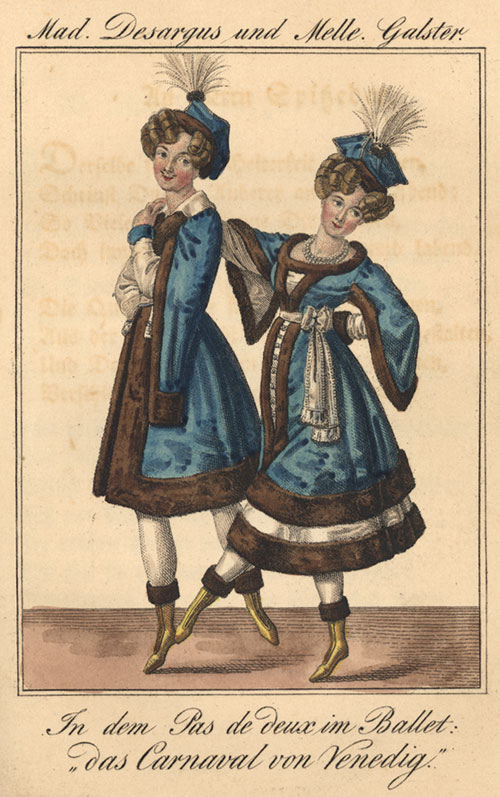
Polish ballet performers at the 1827 Venice Carnival. The dancer on the left is performing "en travestie" as a woman taking the man's role.

The ballerina became the most popular dance performer in Europe in the first half of the 19th century, gradually turning the spotlight away from the male dancer. In many performances, ballet heroes were played by a woman, like the Principal Boy in pantomime.

The professionalism of ballet companies became a focus for a new generation of ballet masters and dancers. Vienna was an important source of influential ballet coaches. The first ballet master of Hungary's National Theatre and Royal Opera was the Vienna-born Frigyes Campilli, who worked in Budapest for 40 years.

The 19th century was a period of great social change, which was reflected in ballet by a shift away from the aristocratic sensibilities that had dominated earlier periods through romantic ballet. Ballerinas such as Geneviève Gosselin, Marie Taglioni and Fanny Elssler experimented with new techniques such as pointework that gave the ballerina prominence as the ideal stage figure. Taglioni was known as the "Christian Dancer," as her image was light and pure (associated with her role as the sylph in La Sylphide). She was trained primarily by her father, Filipo Taglioni. In 1834, Fanny Elssler arrived at the Paris Opera and became known as the "Pagan Dancer," because of the fiery qualities of the Cachucha dance that made her famous. Professional librettists began crafting the stories in ballets. Teachers like Carlo Blasis codified ballet technique in the basic form that is still used today. The ballet boxed toe shoe was invented to support pointe work.

=== Romantic movement ===
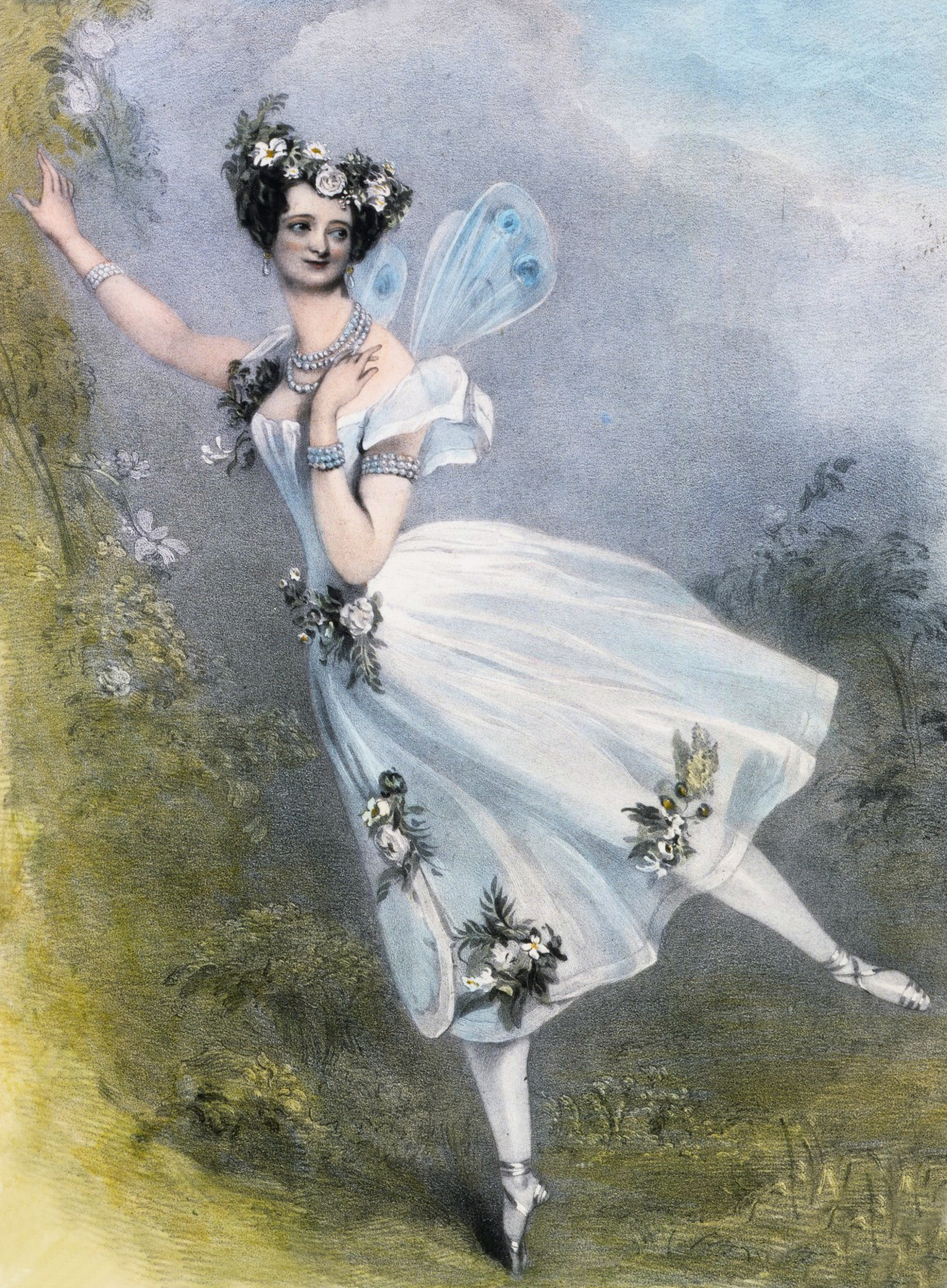
Marie Taglioni as Flore in Charles Didelot's ballet Flore et Zéphire (ca. 1831). She was a pioneer of pointework.

The Romantic movement in art, literature, and theatre was a reaction against formal constraints and the mechanics of industrialization.[22] The zeitgeist led choreographers to compose romantic ballets that appeared light, airy and free that would act as a contrast to the spread of reductionist science through many aspects of daily life that had, in the words of Edgar Allan Poe, "driven the hamadryad from the woods". These "unreal" ballets portrayed women as fragile unearthly beings, ethereal creatures who could be lifted effortlessly and almost seemed to float in the air. Ballerinas began to wear costumes with pastel, flowing skirts that bared the shins. The stories revolved around uncanny, folkloric spirits. An example of one such romantic ballet is La Sylphide, one of the oldest romantic ballets still performed today.

One strain of the Romantic movement was a new exploration of folklore and traditional ethnic culture. This influence was seen in the emergence of European folk dance and western portrayals of African, Asian, and Middle East peoples on European stages. In ballets from this period, non-European characters were often created as villains or as silly divertisements to fit the orientalist western understanding of the world. The National Opera of Ukraine, a performing arts theatre with a resident opera company, was established in Kyiv in 1867. It also included a small resident troupe of ballet dancers, who would perform mainly folk-style dancing during opera productions. By 1893, this grew to a troupe large enough to stage large ballets. Folk dancing and ballets with Ukrainian stories were among the early productions.

Many leading European professional ballet companies that survive today were established at new theatres in Europe's capital cities during the mid- to late- 19th century, including the Kyiv Ballet, the Hungarian National Ballet, the National Theatre Ballet (Prague) and the Vienna State Ballet (formerly the Vienna State Opera Ballet). These theatres usually combined large opera, drama and ballet companies under the same roof. Composers, dramatists, and choreographers were then able to create works that took advantage of the ability to collaborate among these performance troupes.

=== Russia ===
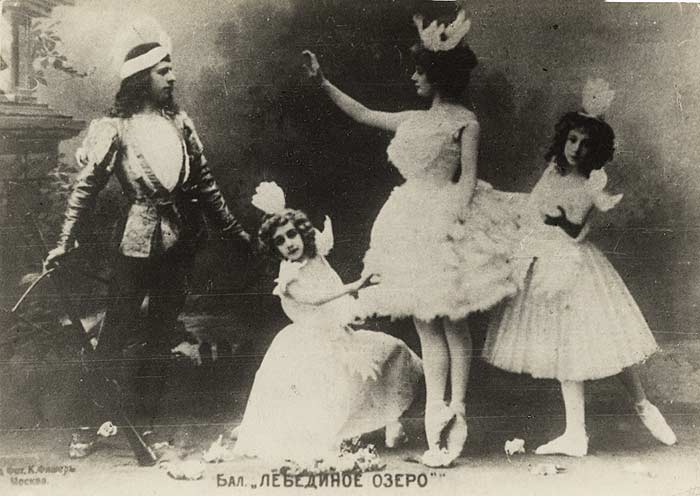
Mikhail Mordkin as Prince Siegfried and Adelaide Giuri as Odette with students as the little swans in the Moscow Imperial Bolshoi Theatre's production of the Petipa/Ivanov/Tchaikovsky Swan Lake. 1901

While France was instrumental in early ballet, other countries and cultures soon adopted the art form, most notably Russia. Russia has a recognized tradition of ballet, and Russian ballet has had great importance in its country throughout history. After 1850, ballet began to wane in Paris, but it flourished in Denmark and Russia thanks to masters such as August Bournonville, Jules Perrot, Arthur Saint-Léon, Enrico Cecchetti and Marius Petipa. In the late nineteenth century, orientalism was in vogue. Colonialism brought awareness of Asian and African cultures, but distorted with disinformation and fantasy. The East was often perceived as a faraway place where anything was possible, provided it was lavish, exotic and decadent. Petipa appealed to popular taste with The Pharaoh's Daughter (1862), and later The Talisman (1889), and La Bayadère (1877). Petipa is best remembered for his collaborations with Tchaikovsky. He used his music for his choreography of The Nutcracker (1892, though this is open to some debate among historians), The Sleeping Beauty (1890), and the definitive revival of Swan Lake (1895, with Lev Ivanov). These works were all drawn from European folklore.

The female dancers' classical tutu as it is recognized today began to appear at this time. It consisted of a short, stiff skirt supported by layers of crinoline or tulle that revealed the acrobatic legwork, combined with a wide gusset that served to preserve modesty.

=== Argentina ===
Ballet companies from Europe began lucrative tours of theatres in North, Central and South America during the mid-19th century. The prestigious Colon Theater in Buenos Aires, Argentina had hosted foreign ballet artists on its stage, with touring companies from Europe presenting full ballets as early as 1867. By the 1880s, the Colon Theater had its own professional ballet company. It would still be several decades before most countries outside of Europe could claim their own professional ballet companies, however.

== 20th century and modernism ==
=== Russia and the Ballets Russes ===
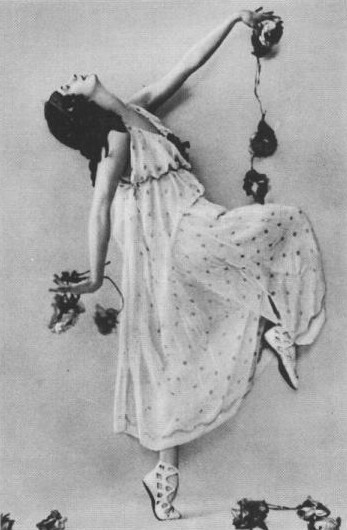
Anna Pavlova as a bacchante in Bacchanale by Mikhail Mordkin.

Sergei Diaghilev brought ballet full-circle back to Paris when he opened his company, Ballets Russes. It was made up of dancers from the Russian exile community in Paris after the Revolution.

Diaghilev and composer Igor Stravinsky merged their talents to bring Russian folklore to life in The Firebird and Petrushka choreographed by Fokine. Diaghilev's next choreographic commissions went to Nijinsky. His First ballet was L'apres-midi d'un Faune (Afternoon of a Faun) to music by Debussy. It was notable for its two dimensional shapes and lack of ballet technique. It caused controversy by depicting the faun rubbing the scarf of one of the maidens on himself, in simulated masturbation. The most controversial work of the Ballets Russes however, was The Rite of Spring, choreographed by Nijinsky with music by Stravinsky. The ballet's modern music, pigeon toed stomping and theme of human sacrifice shocked audiences so much they rioted.

After the "golden age" of Petipa, Michel Fokine began his career in St. Petersburg but moved to Paris and worked with Diaghilev and the Ballets Russes.

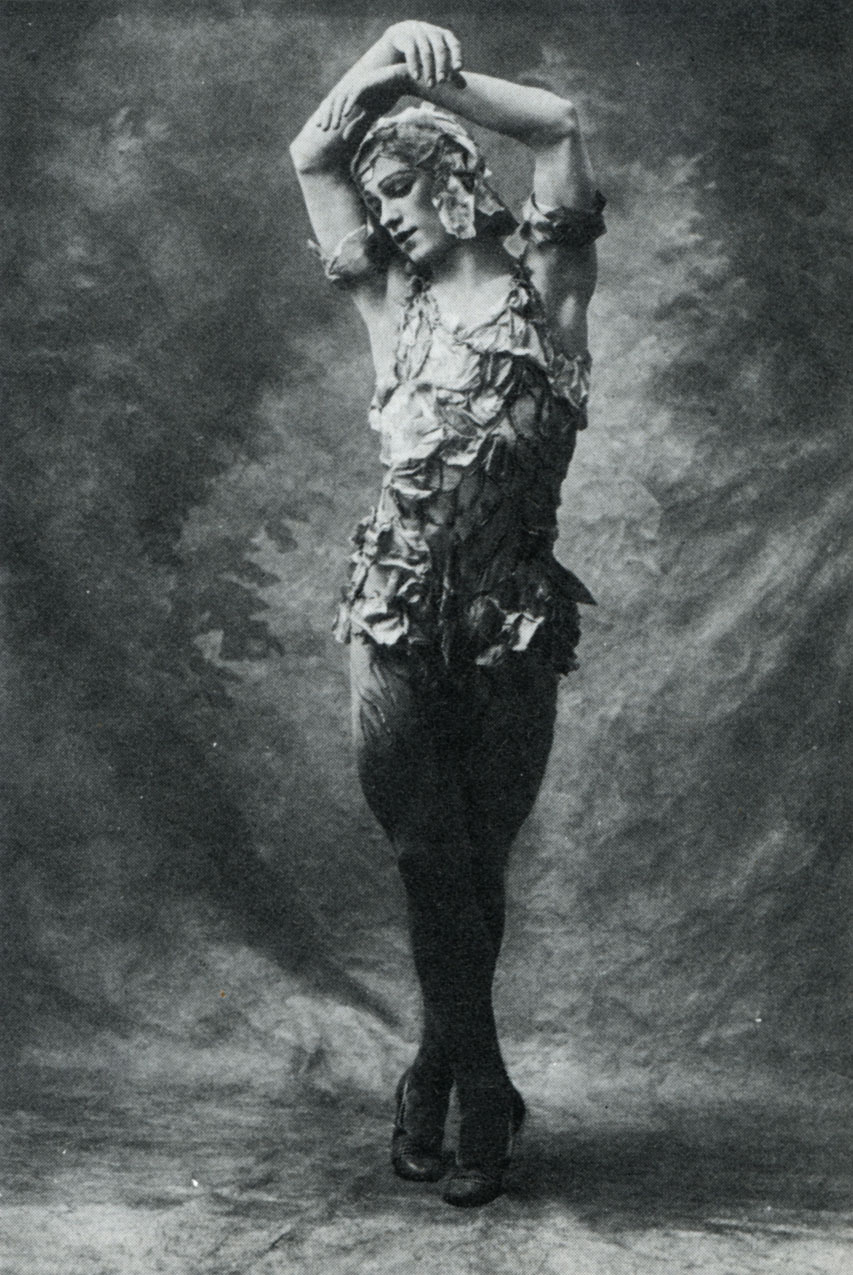
Vaslav Nijinsky in The Spectre of the Rose, 1911.

Russian ballet continued development under Soviet rule. There was little talent left in the country after the Revolution, but it was enough to seed a new generation. After stagnation in the 1920s, by the mid-1930s that new generation of dancers and choreographers appeared on the scene. The technical perfection and precision of dance was promoted (and demanded) by Agrippina Vaganova, who had been taught by Petipa and Cecchetti and headed the Vaganova Ballet Academy, the school to prepare dancers for the Kirov Ballet in St. Petersburg/Leningrad.

Ballet was popular with the public. Both the Moscow-based Bolshoi and the St. Petersburg (then Leningrad)-based Kirov ballet companies were active. Ideological pressure forced the creation of many socialist realist pieces, most of which made little impression on the public and were removed from the repertoire of both companies later.

Some pieces of that era, however, were remarkable. The Romeo and Juliet by Prokofiev and Lavrovsky is a masterpiece. The Flames of Paris, while it shows all the faults of socialist realist art, pioneered the active use of the corps de ballet in the performance and required stunning virtuosity. The ballet version of the Pushkin poem, The Fountain of Bakhchisarai with music from Boris Asafiev and choreography by Rostislav Zakharov was also a hit.

The well-known ballet Cinderella, for which Prokofiev provided the music, is also the product of the Soviet ballet. During the Soviet era, these pieces were mostly unknown outside the Soviet Union and later outside of the Eastern Bloc. However, after the collapse of the Soviet Union they received more recognition.

The 1999 North American premiere of The Fountain of Bakhchisarai by the Kirov Ballet in New York was an outstanding success, for example. The Soviet era of the Russian Ballet put a lot of emphasis on technique, virtuosity and strength. It demanded strength usually above the norm of contemporary Western dancers. Notable prima ballerinas include Galina Ulanova, Natalya Dudinskaya and Maya Plisetskaya and choreographers such as Pyotr Gusev.

Russian companies, particularly after World War II engaged in multiple tours all over the world that revitalized ballet in the West.

Maiden Tower written by Afrasiyab Badalbeyli is the first ballet in the Muslim East.

=== United States ===
Following the move of the Ballets Russes to France, ballet began to have a broader influence, particularly in the United States of America.

From Paris, after disagreements with Diaghilev, Fokine went to Sweden and then the US and settled in New York. Diaghilev believed that traditional ballet offered little more than prettiness and athletic display. For Fokine that was not enough. In addition to technical virtuosity he demanded drama, expression and historical authenticity. The choreographer must research the period and cultural context of the setting and reject the traditional tutu in favour of accurate period costuming.

Fokine choreographed Sheherazade and Cleopatra. He also reworked Petrouchka and The Firebird. One of his most famous works was The Dying Swan, performed by Anna Pavlova. Beyond her talents as a ballerina, Pavlova had the theatrical gifts to fulfill Fokine's vision of ballet as drama. Legend has it that Pavlova identified so much with the swan role that she requested her swan costume from her deathbed.

George Balanchine developed state-of-the-art technique in America by opening a school in New York. He adapted ballet to the new media, movies and television. A prolific worker, Balanchine rechoreographed classics such as Swan Lake and Sleeping Beauty as well as creating new ballets. He produced original interpretations of the dramas of William Shakespeare such as Romeo and Juliet and A Midsummer Night's Dream, and also of Franz Léhar's The Merry Widow.

In 1967, Balanchine's Jewels broke with the narrative tradition and dramatized a theme rather than a plot. This focus fits with the state-sponsored funding sources in the United States which sought to encourage "liberty and freethinking" in contrast to narrative-driven dance, which was seen as to be connected too closely with socialism, especially Soviet communism. Today, partly thanks to Balanchine, ballet is one of the most well-preserved dances in the world.

Barbara Karinska was a Russian emigree and a skilled seamstress who collaborated with Balanchine to elevate the art of costume design from a secondary role to an integral part of a ballet performance. She introduced the bias cut and a simplified classic tutu that allowed the dancer more freedom of movement. With meticulous attention to detail, she decorated her tutus with beadwork, embroidery, crochet and appliqué.

==== Ballet During the Cold War in U.S. ====
The Cold War was characterized by ideological competition between the capitalist United States and the communist Soviet Union. Ballet performances were often used to demonstrate the artistic and creative freedom prevalent in Western societies, contrasting with the perceived restrictions on artistic expression in the Soviet Union. Many ballet companies like the Bolshoi Ballet from the Soviet Union and the American Ballet Theatre from the United States were seen as ambassadors of their respective nations. They performed in international tours, including exchanges between the Soviet Union and the United States, showcasing their artistic excellence and promoting cultural understanding. For example, the ballet company American Ballet Theatre went on a tour of the Soviet Union between 13th September and 23rd October 1960. The repertoire included both very ‘American’ ballets such as Fancy Free and Rodeo as well as more classical ballets, such as the Black Swan pas de deux from Swan Lake. Additionally, Russian ballet companies also went on tours of the US. For example, the Bolshoi Ballet company went on a tour of America in September 1962. According to Anne Searcy, an assistant professor in the School of Music, in her book "Ballet in the Cold War," the tours during the Cold War era were not solely about ballet performances but also served as a means for the U.S. and Soviet governments to assert their influence on a global scale. Searcy argues that these tours had underlying political motives, with both nations competing for global control and attempting to shape the perception of the rest of the world. Similarly, Cadra McDaniel also supports this view. He uses the example of a letter written by the director of the Bolshoi (Orvid) to the Soviet minister to culture after the first tour of the Bolshoi Ballet in America, in which Orvid wrote that he was trying to secure rights to show the Bolshoi performances on American television. McDaniels argues that this shows that the Soviets aimed to expand their reach beyond theaters. He suggests that by Americans seeing Russian ballet, the Soviets hoped that American citizens would grow to appreciate the soviet system, and eventually to appreciate communism. The audience reception of the American tours in Russia and Russian tours in America differed greatly. Searcy highlights that the audiences in both nations reacted in unexpected ways, and despite the ideological differences, ballet in the United States and the Soviet Union shared more similarities than either side was willing to acknowledge. Dancers Rudolf Nureyev and Mikhail Baryshnikov from the Soviet Union defected to the West during the Cold War. Their high-profile defections brought attention to the artistic repression in the Soviet Union and highlighted the allure of freedom and artistic expression in the West.

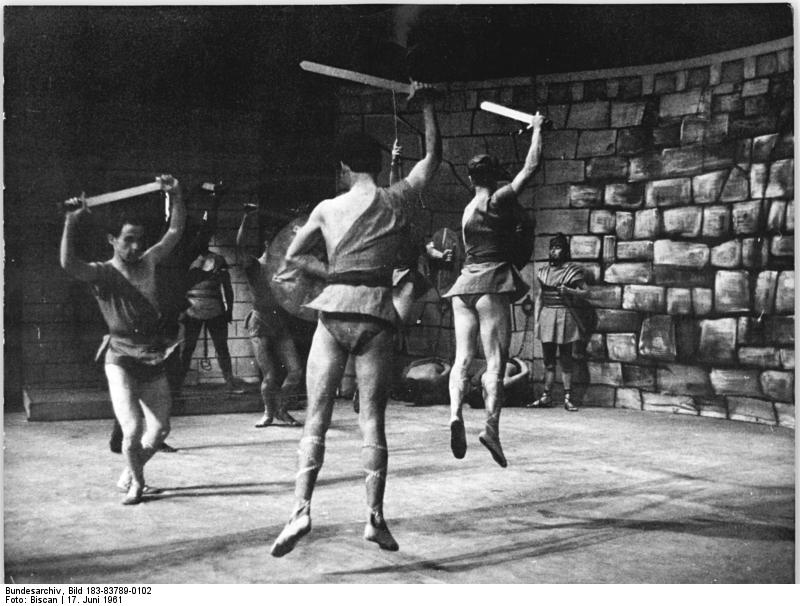
Spartacus Ballet

However, during the cultural exchanges between the United States and the Soviet Union, cultural misunderstandings commonly obstructed the ballet performances. Bolshoi Ballet's production of "Spartacus" choreographed by Leonid Yakobson caused conflict with Americans, as they didn't see the performance as a ballet. Coincidentally, a Hollywood film with the same title had just been released, leading to the confusion among the audiences. The Soviet producers had hoped to convey the ballet's message of proletarian revolt, but American viewers found the production unfamiliar and unconventional. The dancers wore flat Roman sandals instead of the traditional pointe shoes, and the affordability of movie tickets led to disappointment and disapproval from the audience. This resulted in many negative reactions, and the ballet was unfortunately removed from the scheduled performances, causing more conflict and hatred between Russians and Americans.

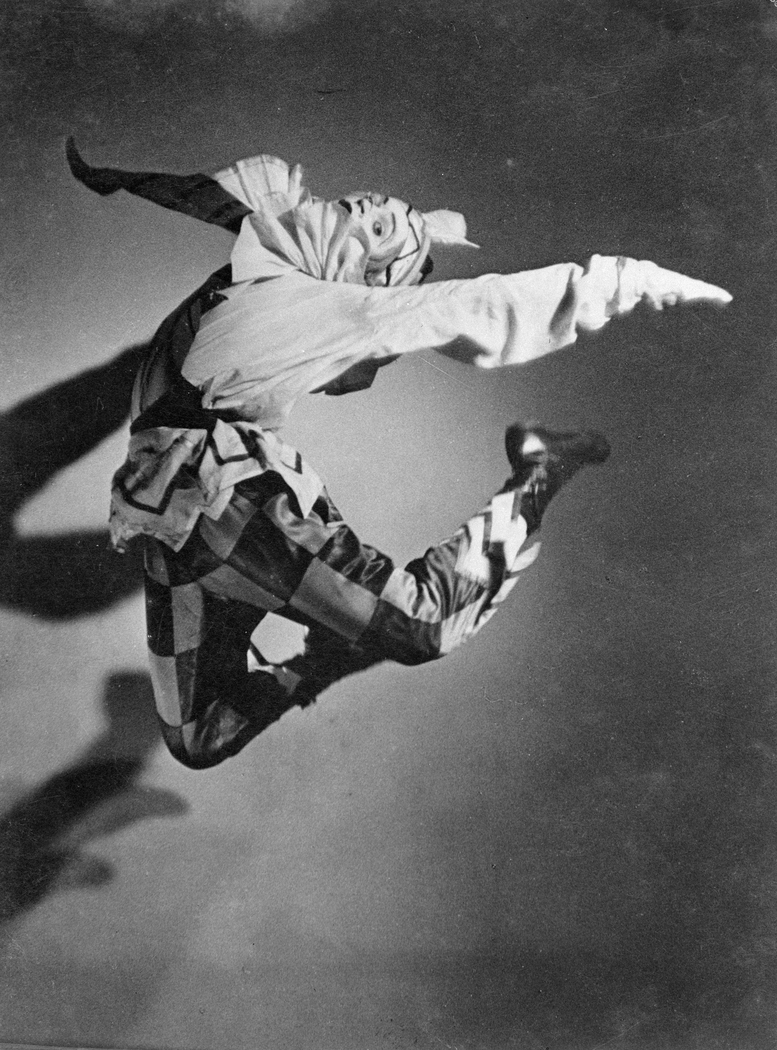
Petruchka by Igor StravinskyUnidentified dancer (Yura Lazovsky?) as Petrushka Sydney, March 1940

Besides the misconceptions and conflict, ballet was used as a tool of soft power, a means to project cultural influence and ideals. The Ballet Russes - a company in Paris consisting of a Russian instructor and Russian dancers - impacted the view of how America saw Russia positively. They showcased their artistic achievements and showcased their cultural heritage, attempting to win hearts and minds and helping Russia gain its recognition in ballet in the Western world. These ballet performances were seen as symbols of national pride and cultural superiority. This company brought a wealth of Russian cultural elements to their performances. This included Russian composers, choreographers, painters, traditional costumes, melodies, and stories. Notably, the ballet that showcased the most Russian influences, like Petrushka, were also the most popular among the audience. While these performances did not necessarily depict the actual Russia of the time, they contributed to a perception of Russia in the Western mind as a symbol of progressiveness and exceptional artistic talent. After the impact of the Ballet Russes, Russian ballet has been accepted into American culture and provided inspiration for America to incorporate ballet into their own culture as well.

In 1963, Lincoln Kirstein's American Ballet which was the first ballet made in America achieved significant success, thanks to the support of the Ford Foundation, which established George Balanchine's neoclassical style as a prominent national institution. By examining the cultural diplomacy efforts of the New York City Ballet, it became apparent that Balanchine occupied a favorable position within the networks formed between the government, private and corporate foundations, and the arts during the cultural Cold War, however, the collaboration between the ballet company and the government is complex, as the artists often held distinct political motivations from the state. The Cold War had a transformative shift in arts funding, organization, and management on the belief in the societal influence of art that had been nurtured in the 1930s.

Ballet performances were sometimes infused with political symbolism during the Cold War. Choreographers and dancers used the medium to express political ideas or comment on societal issues. These performances had the potential to start discussions and debates about politics, society, and the role of art in shaping public opinion. Overall, the exposure to ballet during the Cold War influenced American culture by expanding artistic horizons and introducing new styles. and techniques. It contributed to the development of American ballet companies, the growth of dance education, and the popularization of ballet as an art form in the United States.

== Neoclassical ballet ==
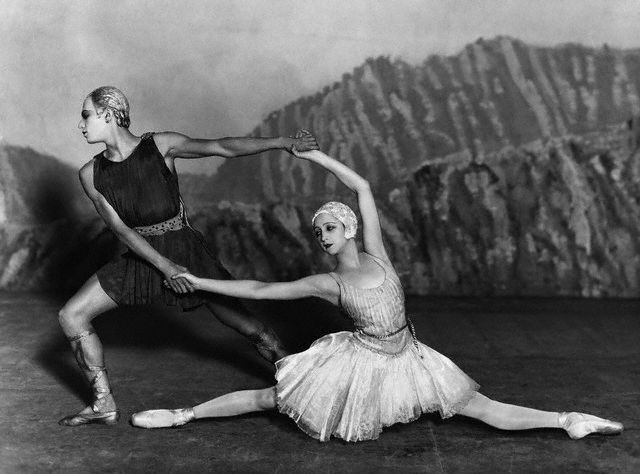
Ballets Russes with Apollo (1928) choreographed by George Balanchine. Dancers are Alexandrova Danilova and Serge Lifar.

George Balanchine is often considered to have been the first pioneer of what is now known as neoclassical ballet, a style of dance between classical ballet and today's contemporary ballet. Tim Scholl, author of From Petipa to Balanchine, considers Balanchine's Apollo (1928) to be the first neoclassical ballet. It represented a return to form in response to Serge Diaghilev's abstract ballets. Apollo and other works are still performed today, predominantly by the New York City Ballet. However, other companies are able to pay a fee for performance rights to George Balanchine's works.

Frederick Ashton is another prominent choreographer associated with the neoclassical style. Three of his works have become standard pieces in the international repertoire: Sylvia (1952), Romeo and Juliet (1956), and Ondine (1958), the last of which was created as a vehicle to showcase Margot Fonteyn.

== Contemporary ==
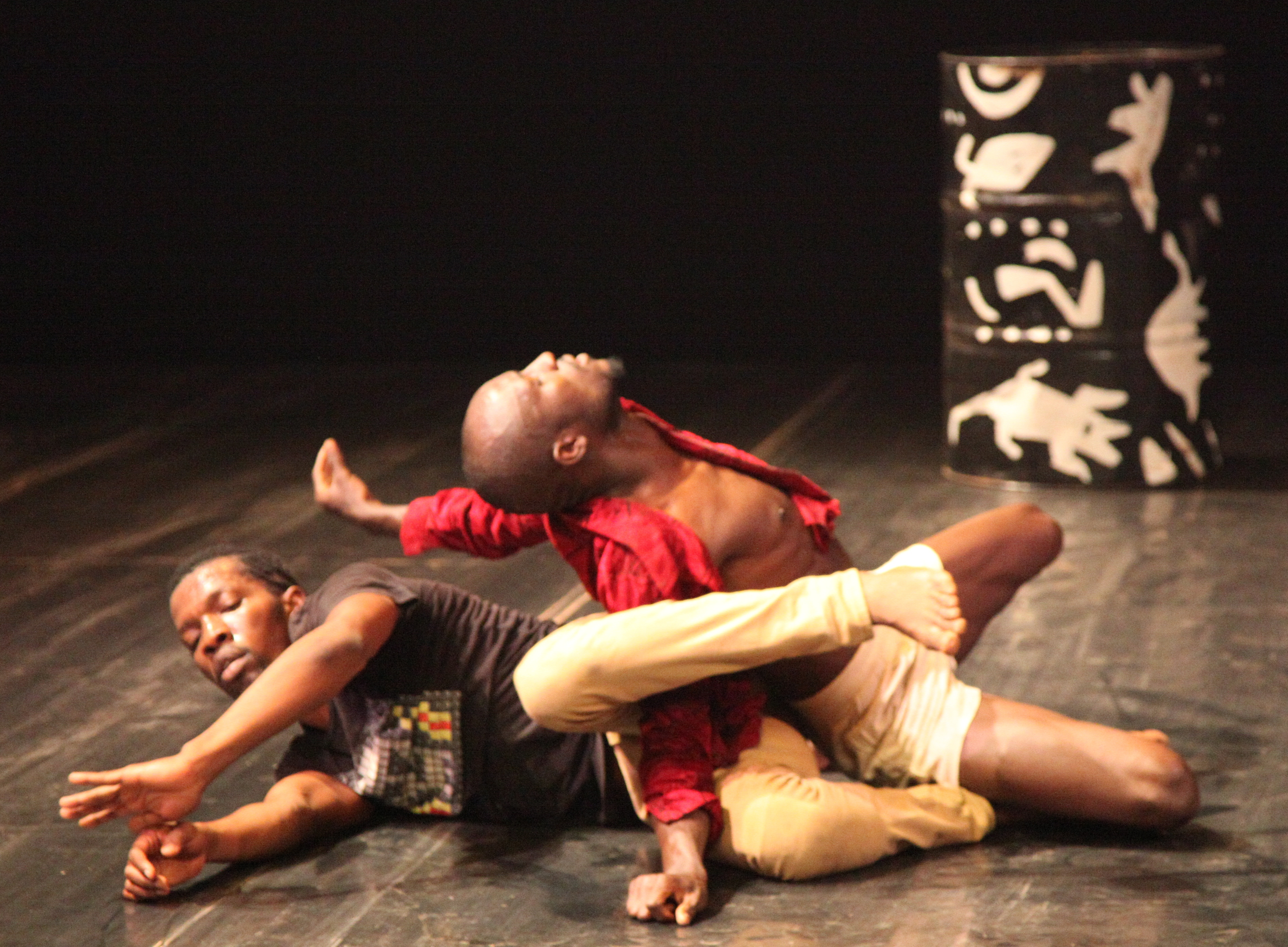
A 2010 performance of Irène Tassembédo's contemporary ballet piece Allah Garibou.

One dancer who trained with Balanchine and absorbed much of this neo-classical style was Mikhail Baryshnikov. Following Baryshnikov's appointment as artistic director of American Ballet Theatre in 1980, he worked with various modern choreographers, most notably Twyla Tharp. Tharp choreographed Push Comes To Shove for ABT and Baryshnikov in 1976; in 1986 she created In The Upper Room for her own company. Both these pieces were considered innovative for their use of distinctly modern movements melded with the use of pointe shoes and classically trained dancers—for their use of contemporary ballet. Women pioneers of contemporary ballet were Martha Graham and Isadora Duncan.

Tharp also worked with the Joffrey Ballet company, founded in 1957 by Robert Joffrey. She choreographed Deuce Coupe for them in 1973, using pop music and a blend of modern and ballet techniques. The Joffrey Ballet continued to perform numerous contemporary pieces, many choreographed by co-founder Gerald Arpino.

Today there are many contemporary ballet companies and choreographers. These include Madrid Ballet; Royal Ballet of Flanders; Alonzo King and his company, Alonzo King LINES Ballet; Nacho Duato and Compañia Nacional de Danza; William Forsythe, who has worked extensively with the Frankfurt Ballet and today runs The Forsythe Company; and Jiří Kylián, formerly the artistic director of the Nederlands Dans Theater. Traditionally "classical" companies, such as the Kirov Ballet and the Paris Opera Ballet, also regularly perform contemporary works.

== Development of ballet method ==
Several well-known ballet methods are named after their originators. For example, two prevailing systems from Russia are known as the Vaganova method after Agrippina Vaganova, and the Legat Method, after Nikolai Legat. The Cecchetti method was invented by Italian dancer Enrico Cecchetti (1850–1928), and the Bournonville method, which was invented by August Bournonville (1805–1879), is employed chiefly in Bournonville's own country of Denmark.

== See also ==
- List of ballets by title
- Ballet music
- History of dance
- Black women in ballet
