= Attila Egerházi =

Hungarian dance choreographer

- Born: 13 October 1964 (age 61); Budapest
- Occupation: contemporary dance choreographer

Attila Egerházi (born 13 October 1964) is a Hungarian former dancer and contemporary dance choreographer

== Life ==
Initially he inspired by the theater and music art, Attila started his acting studies at the Hungarian National Theater's Acting Studio and at the same time, he also studied classical guitar. At the age of 16 he intensively turned to the dance art and he started his ballet and contemporary dance studies at the school of Jeszenszky Endre. After his studies he went to work abroad to the Vienna Dance Laboratory Company directed by Ismael Ivo. In 1989 he became a dancer at the Hungarian National Ballet at the Hungarian National Opera House where he spent 12 seasons. During this period he started his choreographic career with the ballet of 'Talking Bodies'. With the support of the ballet director Harangozó Gyula, he founded and artistically directed during 4 years the Contemporary Choreographic Studio of the Hungarian National Ballet which Studio still existing.

== Work ==
After his dance career he became the artistic director of one of the most relevant contemporary ballet company at Hungary named Ballet Pecs in 2000.

During his artistic director's works in different kind of companies next to his choreographic works he also collaborated outstanding guest choreographers like Jiří Kylián, Rui Horta, Jorma Elo, Vaclav Kunes, Petr Zuska, Mario Radacovsky, Miriam Nasy, Lidia Wos, Jan Kodet, Kristian Ole Tangen.

- 2000 - 2003 artistic director of Ballet Pécs (Hungary)
- 2004 - 2006 ballet director of Ballet Debrecen (Hungary)
- 2006 - 2009 founder and ballet director of the Hungarian Ballet Theater (Hungary)
- 2009 - 2016 artistic director of the South Bohemian Ballet (Budweis-Czech Republic)

=== Most relevant works ===
- Talking Bodies (1998)
- Closed Curtains (2000)
- Carmen (2002)
- Firebird (2004)
- Zero Gravity (2012)
- Romeo and Juliet (2012)
- About Kafka (2014)
- Swan Lake (2015)

=== Other works ===
- 1990 The Home (Budapest Dance Theatre)
- 1991 Requiem for Youth (Budapest Dance Theatre, later on Ballet Pécs)
- 1992 Four seasons (Budapest Dance Theater)
- 1994 Appolos and some Venuses (Virginia Ballet Theater)
- 1996 Porcelain cradle (Hungarian National Ballet)
- 1998 Reminiscencies (Ballet Pécs),
- 1998 Talking bodies (Hungarian National Ballet, later on Ballet Pécs and Hungarian Ballet Theater)
- 1999 Featherless-winged Angels (Balleto Argentina de Julio Bocca at Buenos Aires),
- 1999 White lotuses (Budapest Dance Theater)
- 2000 Lost senses (Ballet Prague Junior),
- 2000 Closed curtains (Hungarian National Ballet, later on Ballet Prague Junior, Hungarian Ballet Theater)
- 2001 Play-grounds (Ballet Pécs), Wind Rises (Ballet Pécs), Closed-curtains pas de deux (Ballet Pécs, Ballet Debrecen, Hungarian Ballet Theater)
- 2002 Carmen (Ballet Pécs, later on Ballet Debrecen, Hungarian Ballet Theater and South Bohemian Ballet),
- 2002 Nutcracker (Ballet Pécs, later on Ballet Debrecen, Hungarian Ballet Theater and South Bohemian Ballet)
- 2003 Glass Angels (Ballet Prague Junior),
- 2003 The Miraculous Mandarin (Ballet Pécs, later on Ballet Debrecen, Hungarian Ballet Theater and South Bohemian Ballet
- 2003 So In Love (Ballet Prague Junior, later on South Bohemian Ballet),
- 2004 Heavy fly (Hungarian National Ballet)
- 2004 Burlesque (Ballet Debrecen),
- 2004 Firebird (Estonian National Ballet, later on Hungarian Ballet Theater and South Bohemian Ballet),
- 2005 Panta Rei (Ballet Győr)
- 2005 Painted Rainbow (Finland National Ballet Gala, later on Ballet Prague Junior, Debrecen Ballet, Hungarian Ballet Theater and South Bohemian Ballet),
- 2006 Mirabell (Ballet Debrecen, later on Hungarian Ballet Theater and South Bohemian Ballet)
- 2007 Black in White (Hungarian Ballet Theater),
- 2007 White Silence (Hungarian Ballet Theater),
- 2007 Carioca (Hungarian Ballet Theater, later on Ballet Prague Junior)
- 2008 Dottie Annie in Farawayland (Children's ballet for the Hungarian Ballet Theater)
- 2008 Glance (Hungarian Ballet Theater, later on Ballet Prague Junior),
- 2008 Bolero (Hungarian Ballet Theater, later on South Bohemian Ballet)
- 2009 Serenade (Hungarian Ballet Theater),
- 2009 Frozen Roses (Hungarian Ballet Theater),
- 2009 A Midsummer Night's Dream (Revolving Theater in Český Krumlov, South Bohemian Ballet),
- 2010 Firebird/Miracoulous mandarin (South Bohemian Ballet),
- 2010 Run Through (South Bohemian Ballet),
- 2010 In and Out (South Bohemian Ballet
- 2011 Closed curtains (South Bohemian Ballet)
- 2011 Bolero, 1 + 1, Painted Rainbow, The Nutcracker (South Bohemian Ballet)
- 2012 Zero Gravity (South Bohemian Ballet)
- 2012 Lost senses (South Bohemian Ballet)
- 2012 Romeo and Julie (South Bohemian Ballet)
- 2013 Curtain up!, (South Bohemian Ballet)
- 2013 Odd couples (South Bohemian Ballet)
- 2014 About Kafka (South Bohemian Ballet - Landestheater Passau)
- 2014 Magic flute (Ballet Prague Junior)
- 2014 Pass-ages (Ballet Prague Junior)
- 2014 Lunatics (South Bohemian Ballet)
- 2015 Swan lake (South Bohemian Ballet)

== Awards ==
- 2003 Harangozó Prize (for high level choreographic and artistic works in the Hungarian Dance Culture)
- 2010 Prize of the Theatre Magazine( Ceny Divadelních novin) (The best theatre production and choreographic work of the year at Czech Republic for the "Firebird" and for the "Miraculous Mandarin" ballets)
- 2015 (The Czech Dance Association's Award: the best choreographer of the year at Czech Republic after the ballet of "About Kafka")
