= Hungarian National Ballet =

Ballet company

General information
- Name: Hungarian National Ballet
- Local name: Magyar Nemzeti Balett
- Year founded: 1884
- Principal venue: Hungarian State Opera House
- Website: www.opera.hu/en/company/ballet

Artistic staff
- Artistic director: Tamás Solymosi

Other
- Formation: Principals; First soloists Soloists; Grand sujets Semi-soloists; Corps de Ballet

The Hungarian National Ballet (Hungarian: Magyar Nemzeti Balett, pronounced [ˈmɒɟɒr ˈnɛmzɛti ˈbɒlɛtː]) is a classical ballet dance company based in Budapest, Hungary. The ballet company is attached to the Hungarian State Opera House, which is also home to the Hungarian State Opera company and the Hungarian State Opera Orchestra. The ballet company was established in 1884.

== History ==
Ballet performances began in Hungary during the 18th century, when they were held in private theatres at aristocratic castles. Professional companies were established that performed throughout Hungary and also toured abroad. The Budapest National Theatre increasingly serving a role as a home for the dancers. The first ballet master of the National Theatre and Royal Opera was the Italian-Viennese Frederico Campilli (German: Friedrich Campilli, Hungarian: Campilli Frigyes), who worked in Budapest for 40 years.

In 1884, the Hungarian Royal Opera House was opened (now known as the Hungarian State Opera House). The Hungarian National Ballet was part of the new theatre community. From the beginning, the Hungarian National Ballet had a reputation as one of the leading companies in Europe, although in the 19th century, the company had a very different structure:

The corps de ballet included 60 artists: 30 female dancers along with 30 regularly performing students. The company was led by two Italian and four Hungarian soloists. The opening Opera House had only female artists except for one single male dancer coming from Milan.

Italian dance technique dominated the company in its early decades, an aspect of the company's history that is shared with European companies such as the Czech National Theatre Ballet (Prague) during the same period. Staging was heavily influenced by Vienna. Consciousness of Hungarian national culture was soon brought to the stage, however, driven in large part by the work of Gyula Harangozó (1908-1974). Scene in a Country Tavern, performed in 1936, is considered a milestone of Hungarian ballet. Other characteristic works include Coppelia, Tricky Students, Sheherezade, and Promenade Music. Hungarian folk dancing was fused with classical ballet into a new creation.

During the company's post-World War II period, László Seregi became the company choreographer. During this period, political and artistic developments resulted in a shift towards Russian technique. However, an element of Hungarian cultural influence remained. During the 1970s, neoclassical ballet works from Western Europe and America were added to the company's repertoire. The Hungarian National Ballet staged works by George Balanchine, Maurice Béjart, Frederick Ashton, Hans van Manen, Alvin Ailey, Jiří Kylián and Robert North. Seregi’s choreographies, such as Spartacus, Romeo and Juliet, A Midsummer Night's Dream and The Taming of the Shrew, have been central to the reputation of Hungarian ballet both at home and abroad since the late 1960s. Michael P. Price designed the lighting for the company's premiere American tour.

== Recent years ==
Gyula Harangozó Jr. was artistic director from 1996 to 2005. Under his influence, the company performed a number of works by Hungarian choreographers: Lilla Pártay (full-length pieces, Anna Karenina, Wolfgang AMADEUS Mozart, Gone with the Wind and The Golden Brush); Gábor Keveházi (full-length piece, Zorba); and Attila Egerházi (contemporary ballet one-act pieces). Harangozó Jr. has been succeeded by Gábor Keveházi, a famous ballet dancer in his own right. Keveházi has maintained a balance of classical repertoire pieces such as Swan Lake and Giselle, and newer works.

The Hungarian National Ballet has long been known as a company with a particularly strong repertoire of folk pieces reflecting national culture. It also remains one of the world's leading classical companies with over 100 dancers. The Hungarian National Ballet also tours internationally.

== See also ==
- Ballet company
- Budapest
- Glossary of ballet
- History of ballet
- Hungarian State Opera House
- List of productions of Swan Lake derived from its 1895 revival
