= Charles Butler (NYU) =

American lawyer

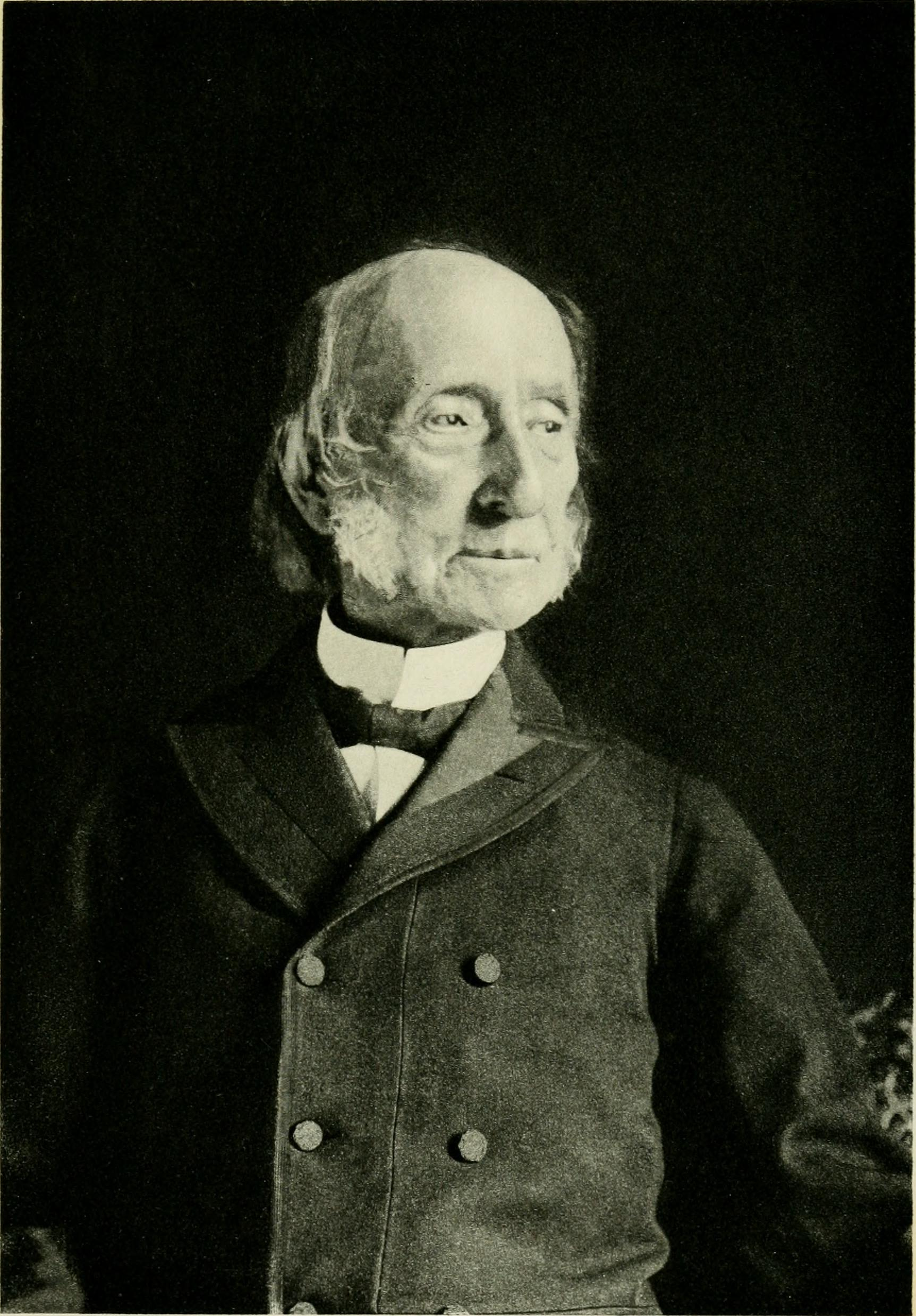
- Born: February 15, 1802; Kinderhook Landing, New York
- Died: December 13, 1897 (aged 95); New York, New York
- Occupation: Lawyer
- Spouse: Eliza A. Ogden (m. 1825)

Charles Butler (February 15, 1802 – December 13, 1897) was an American lawyer and philanthropist.

== Biography ==
Charles Butler was born at Kinderhook Landing, Columbia County, New York. He studied law in the office of Martin Van Buren at Albany, and was admitted to the bar in 1824. He became wealthy by accumulating land at the site of Chicago, Illinois and through his investments in railways. It was his accumulation of Illinois land and railway building that helped turn Chicago into a city.

He married Eliza A. Ogden in 1825.

In 1835, he was one of the founders of the Union Theological Seminary in the City of New York. In 1836, he was appointed to the council of NYU, (where he served as an instructor) and he was a long serving Council President.

He was a younger brother of Benjamin Franklin Butler (US Attorney General under Martin Van Buren), and a relative of (both by blood and as an in-law), as well as a business associate of William Butler Ogden, the first mayor of Chicago.

He died at his home in New York City on December 13, 1897.
