= Vincenzo Botta =

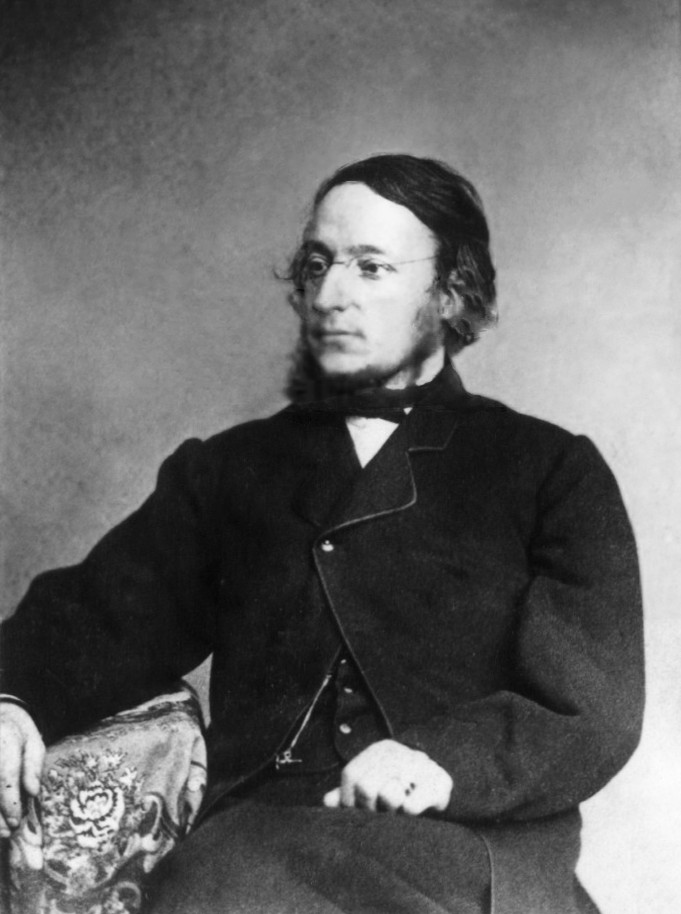
Vincenzo Botta, circa 1860

Vincenzo Botta (November 11, 1818, in Cavallermaggiore – October 5, 1894, in New York City) was an Italian-born politician and professor of philosophy, and later, in the United States, of Italian language and literature.

== Biography ==
Botta was educated at the University of Turin, and became professor of philosophy there. In 1849, he was elected to the Sardinian parliament, and in 1850 commissioned, in association with Dr. Parola, another deputy, to examine the educational system of Germany. Their report on the German universities and schools was published at the expense of the government. In 1853, he met Anne Lynch, a writer from the United States then traveling in Europe.

Also in 1853, Botta was sent to the United States for the purpose of investigating the public school system. He found New York City to his liking, settled there, and became naturalized. He taught philosophy and Italian at the University of the City of New York where for many years he was chair of the department of Italian language and literature.

Botta and Anne Lynch were married in 1855. Their brownstone home at 25 West 37th Street became a meeting place for literary people and artists.

== Works ==
- Pubblico insegnamento in Germania (c. 1850)
- La questiona Americana (1861)
- Discourse on the Life, Character, and Policy of Count Cavour (1862)
- Dante, as Philosopher, Patriot, and Statesman, with an analysis of the Divina Commedia (1865)
- Account of the System of Education in Piedmont
- An Historical Account of Modern Philosophy in Italy in Ueberweg's History of Philosophy from Thales to the Present Time (1872)
