= Jean-Chrysostome Raharison =

Malagasy footballer

Bota
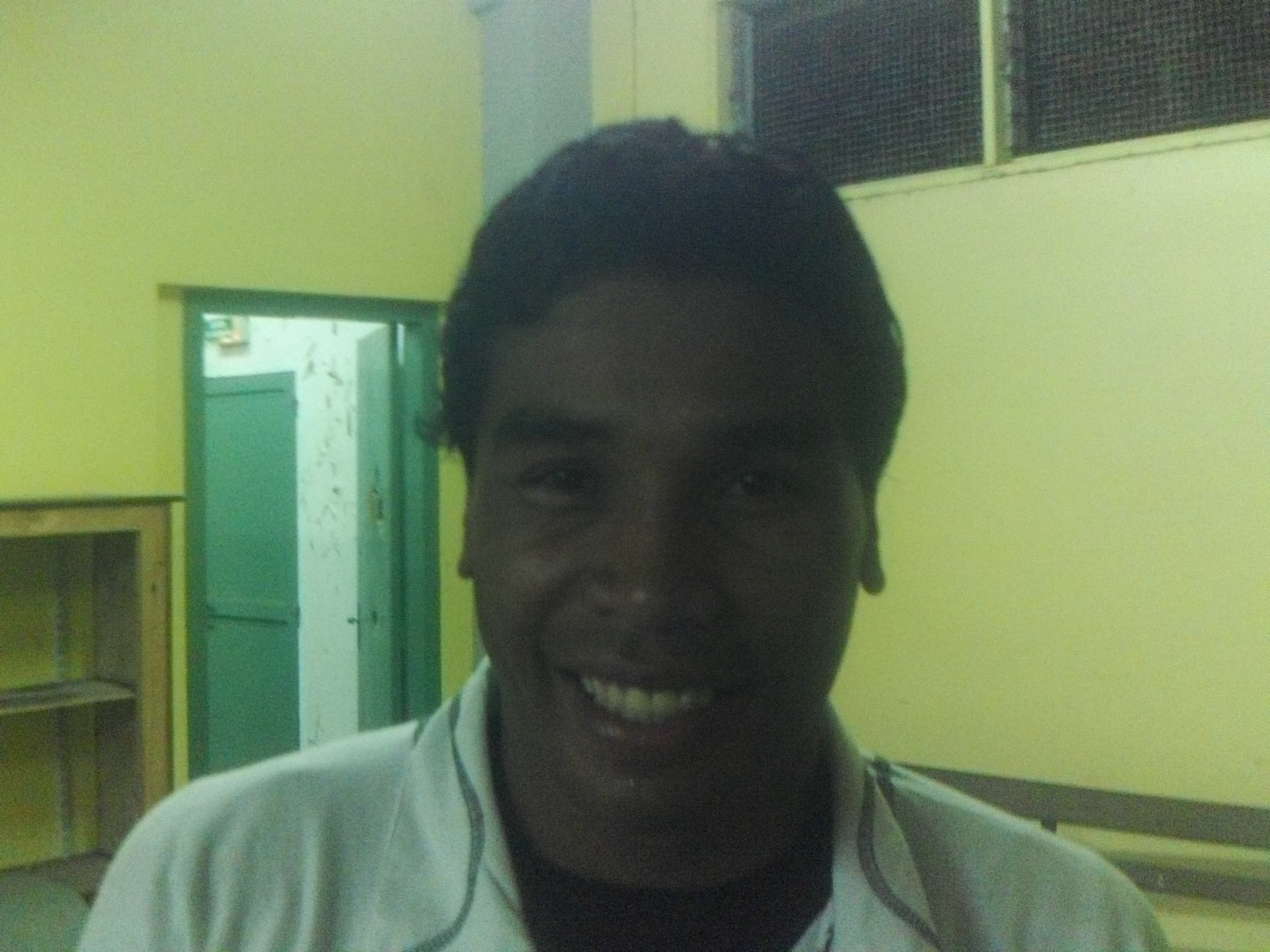

Personal information
- Full name: Jean-Chrysostome Raharison
- Date of birth: 23 August 1979 (age 47)
- Place of birth: Antananarivo, Madagascar
- Height: 1.91 m (6 ft 3 in)
- Position: Goalkeeper

Team information
- Current team: Saint-Louisienne
- Number: 1

Senior career*
Years	Team	Apps	(Gls)
1998–2006	DSA Antananarivo		
2007	USCA Foot		
2008–2009	FC Ilakaka		
2010	AS Marsouins	26	(0)
2011–2014	SS Saint-Louisienne	40	(0)
2015	AS Excelsior		

International career
2001–2010	Madagascar	35	(0)
- * Club domestic league appearances and goals

Jean-Chrysostome Raharison (born 23 August 1979), commonly referred to as Bota, is a Malagasy international footballer who plays for AS Excelsior, as a goalkeeper.

== Career ==
Born in Antananarivo, Madagascar, Farro has played club football in Madagascar and Réunion for DSA Antananarivo, USCA Foot, FC Ilakaka, AS Marsouins and SS Saint-Louisienne.
