= Hungarian State Opera House =

Neo-Renaissance opera house in Budapest

Hungarian State Opera House Hungarian: Magyar Állami Operaház
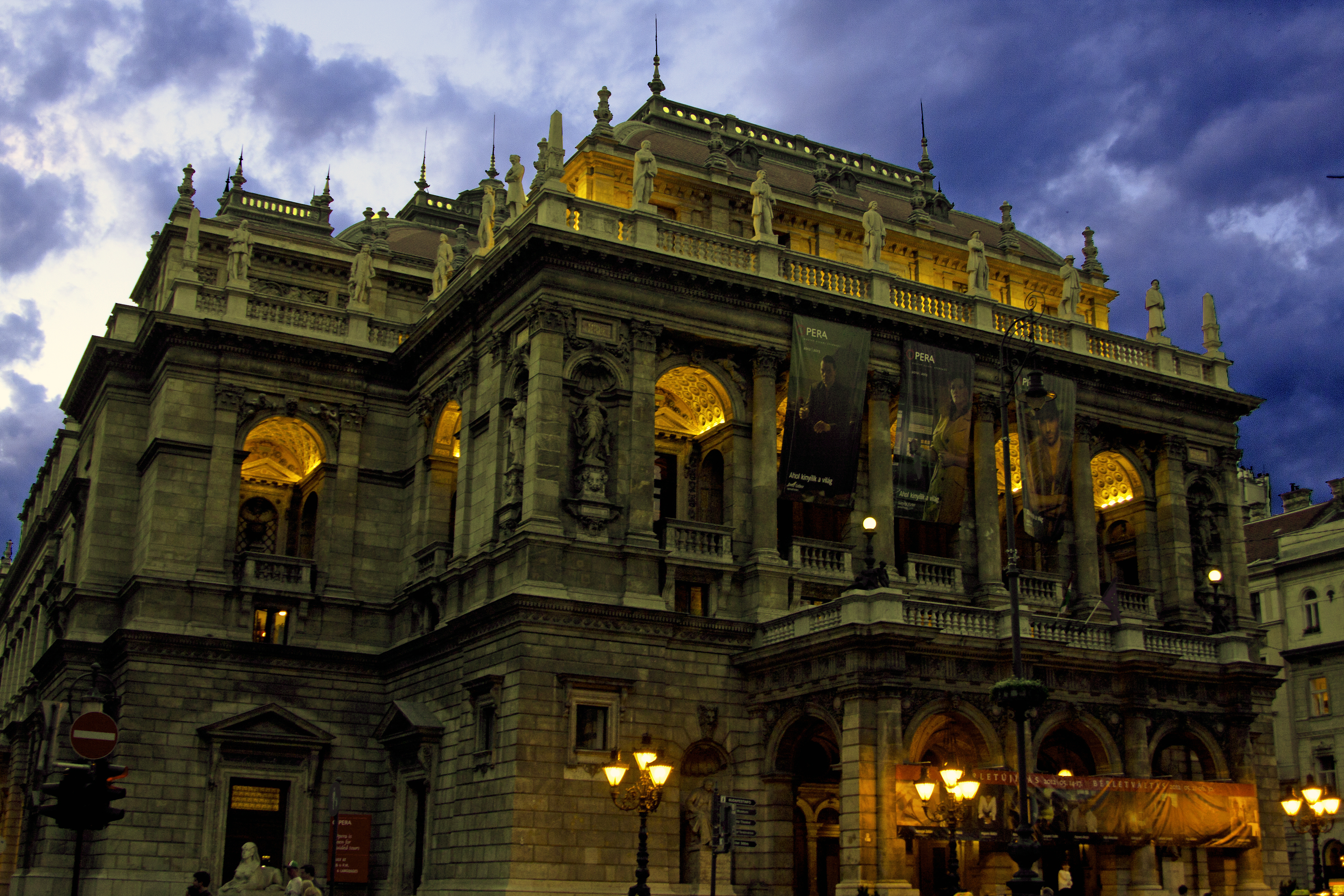
- Interactive map of Hungarian State Opera House; Hungarian: Magyar Állami Operaház
- Address: Andrássy Ave 22.
- Location: Budapest, Hungary
- Coordinates: 47°30′10″N 19°03′29″E
- Owner: Hungarian State
- Capacity: 1000
- Type: Opera house
- Designation

UNESCO World Heritage Site
- Official name: Budapest, including the Banks of the Danube, the Buda Castle Quarter and Andrássy Avenue
- Criteria: Cultural: ii, iv
- Reference: 400
- Inscription: 1987 (11th Session)
- Extensions: 2002
- Area: 473.3 ha (1,170 acres)

Construction
- Built: 1875
- Opened: 1884
- Renovated: 2017
- Architect: Miklós Ybl

Website
- Official website

The Hungarian State Opera House (Hungarian: Magyar Állami Operaház [ˈmɒɟɒr ˈaːlːɒmi ˈopɛrɒɦaːz]) is a historic opera house located in central Budapest, on Andrássy avenue. Originally known as the Hungarian Royal Opera House, it was designed by Miklós Ybl, a major figure of 19th-century Hungarian architecture. Construction began in 1875, funded by the city of Budapest and by Emperor Franz Joseph I of Austria-Hungary, and the new house opened to the public on the 27 September 1884. Before the closure of the "Népszínház" in Budapest, it was the third largest opera building in the city; today it is the second largest opera house in Budapest and in Hungary.

Touring groups had performed operas in the city from the early 19th century, but as Legány notes, "a new epoch began after 1835 when part of the Kasa National Opera and Theatrical Troupe arrived in Buda". They took over the Castle Theatre and, in 1835, were joined by another part of the troupe, after which performances of operas were given under conductor Ferenc Erkel. By 1837 they had established themselves at the Magyar Színház (Hungarian Theatre) and by 1840, it had become the "Nemzeti Színház" (National Theatre). Upon its completion, the opera section moved into the Hungarian Royal Opera House, with performances quickly gaining a reputation for excellence in a repertory of about 45 to 50 operas and about 130 annual performances.

Today, the opera house is home to the Budapest Opera Ball, a society event dating back to 1886.

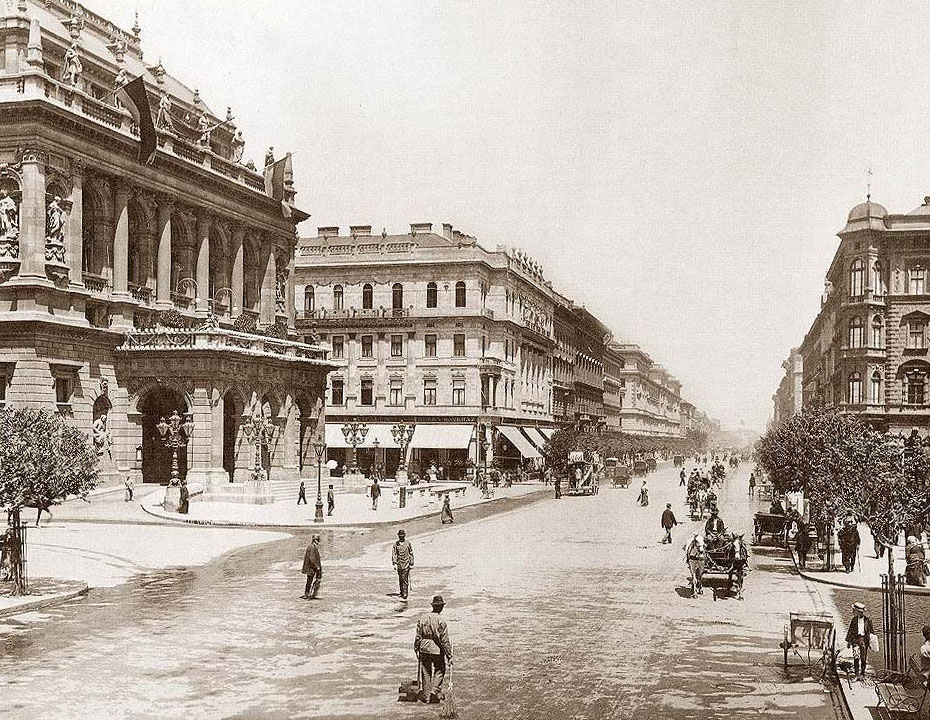
The Opera House is on the left in this view of 1896.

== History ==
Many important artists were guests here including the composer Gustav Mahler, who was director in Budapest from 1888 to 1891 and Otto Klemperer, who was music director for three years from 1947 to 1950.

From 1874 to 1885, Jozefa Ellinger was a member of the Hungarian State Opera House.

In the 1970s the state of the building prompted the Hungarian State to order a major renovation which eventually began in 1980 and lasted till 1984. The reopening was held exactly 100 years after the original opening, on the 27 September 1984.

A second restoration of the building, which the company also calls the Ybl Palace after its architect, lasted nearly five seasons. It returned the house to its original appearance and added modern technology, including new stage machinery, and the Opera House reopened on 12 March 2022 with a three-day festival. During the works the original wall colours and materials were uncovered, the pipework and structure were renewed, the orchestra pit was connected to the auditorium and the boxes were fitted with smart technology.

== Overview ==
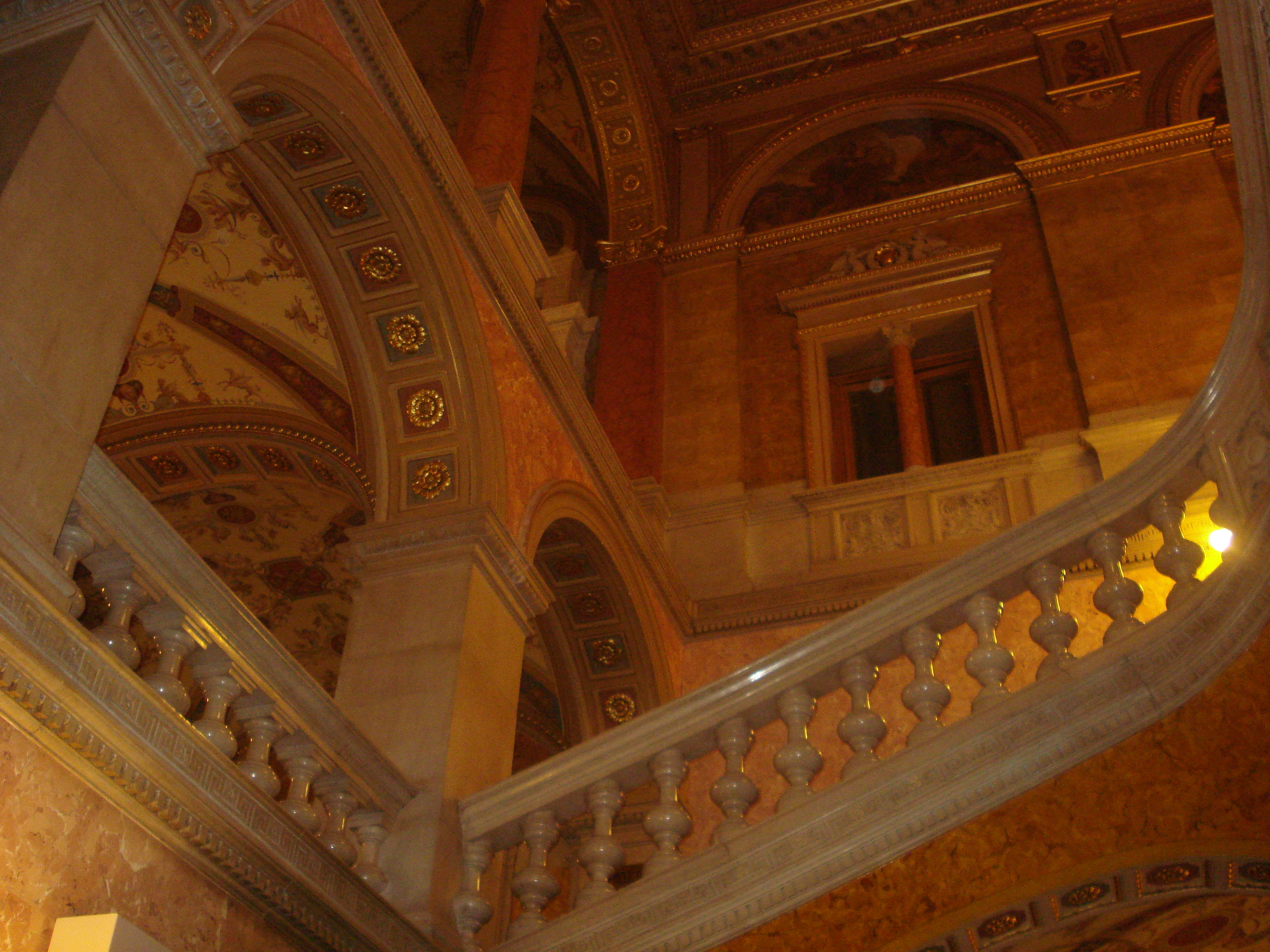
Marble staircase steps up from the main entrance to the first floor

It is a decorated building and is considered one of the architect's masterpieces. It was built in neo-Renaissance style, with elements of Baroque. Ornamentation includes paintings and sculptures by leading figures of Hungarian art including Bertalan Székely, Mór Than and Károly Lotz. Although in size and capacity it is not among the greatest, in beauty and the quality of acoustics the Budapest Opera House is considered to be amongst the finest opera houses in the world.

The auditorium holds 1,261 people. It is horseshoe-shaped and – according to measurements done in the 1970s by a group of international engineers – has the third best acoustics in Europe after La Scala in Milan and the Palais Garnier in Paris. Although many opera houses have been built since, the Budapest Opera House is still among the best in terms of the acoustics.

In front of the building are statues of Ferenc Erkel and Franz Liszt. Liszt is the best known Hungarian composer. Erkel composed the Hungarian national anthem, and was the first music director of the Opera House; he was also founder of the Budapest Philharmonic Orchestra.

Each year the season lasts from September to the end of June and, in addition to opera performances, the House is home to the Hungarian National Ballet.

There are guided tours of the building in six languages (English, German, Spanish, French, Italian and Hungarian) almost every day.

== Architecture ==
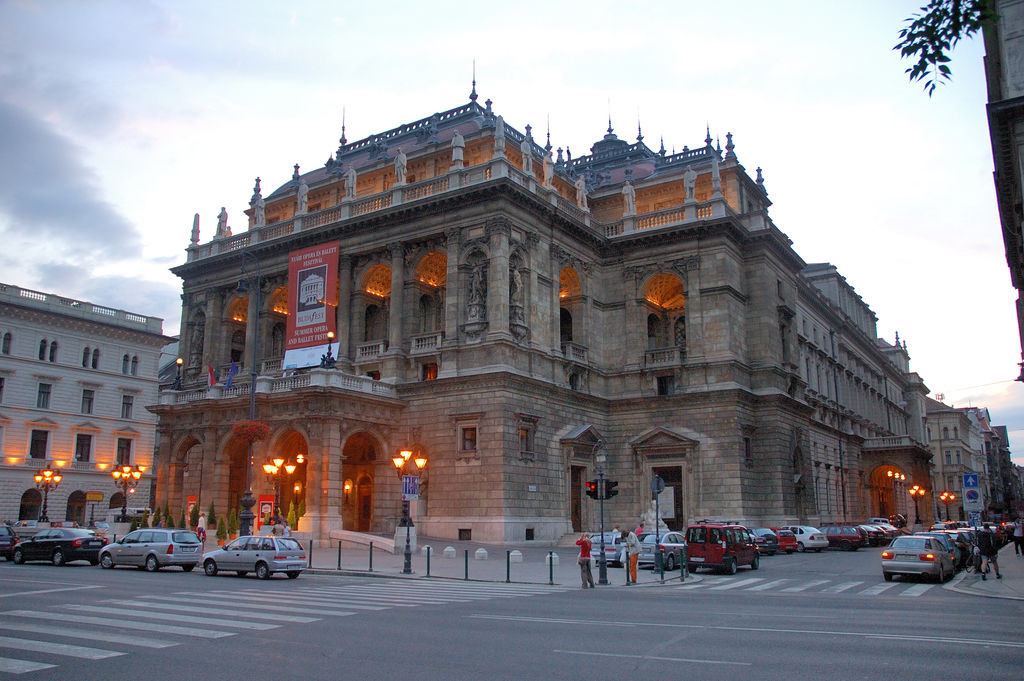
Hungarian State Opera House in 2005

The decoration of the symmetrical façade follows a musical theme. In niches on either side of the main entrance there are figures of Erkel and Liszt, which were sculpted by Alajos Stróbl.

The foyer has marble columns. The vaulted ceiling is covered in murals by Bertalan Székely and Mór Than. They depict the nine Muses.

Wrought-iron lamps illuminate the wide stone staircase and the main entrance. Going to the opera was a great social occasion in the 19th century. A vast, sweeping staircase was an important element of the opera house as it allowed ladies to show off their new gowns.

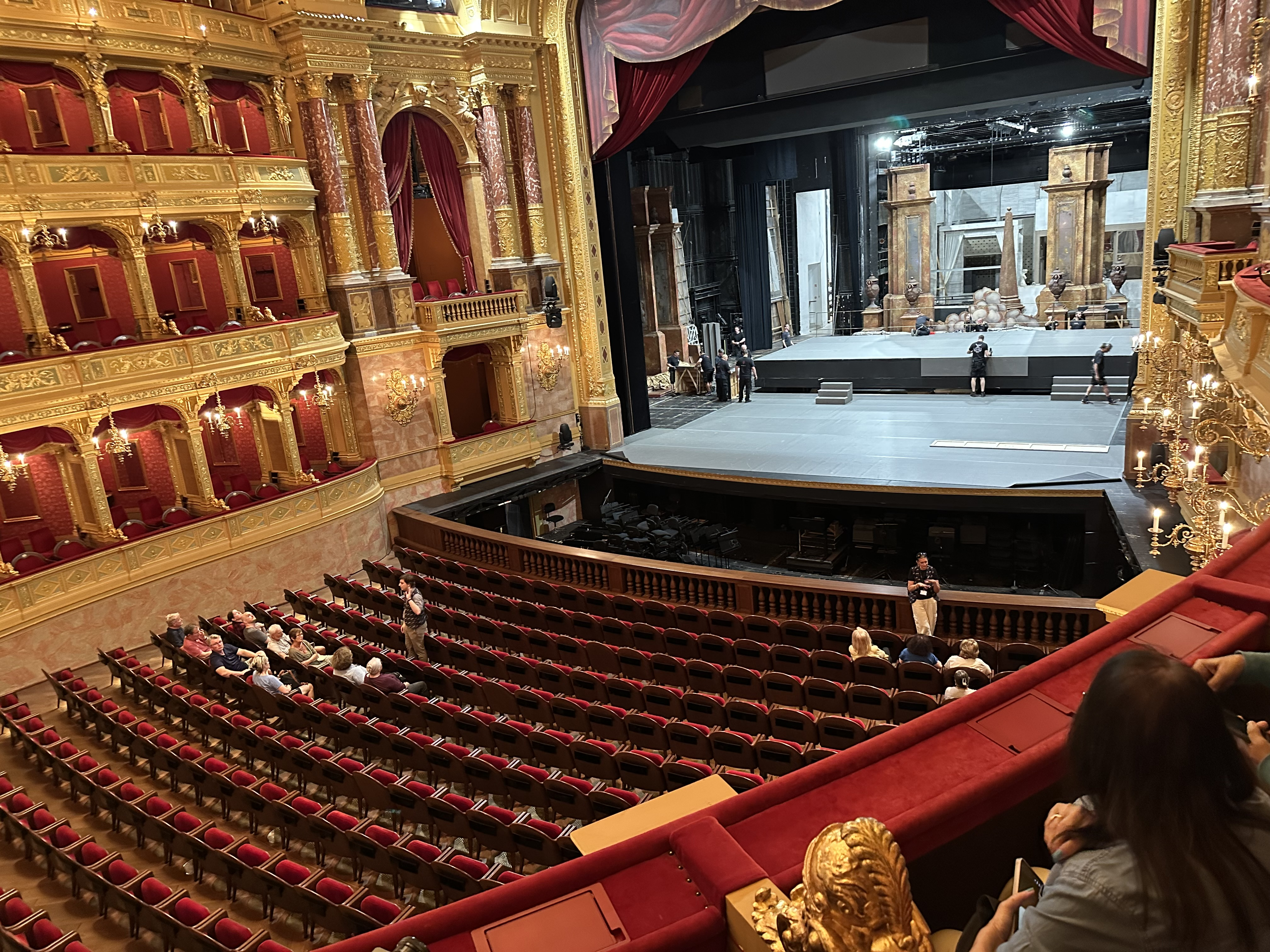
Interior, Hungarian State Opera House, with stage crews doing set-up

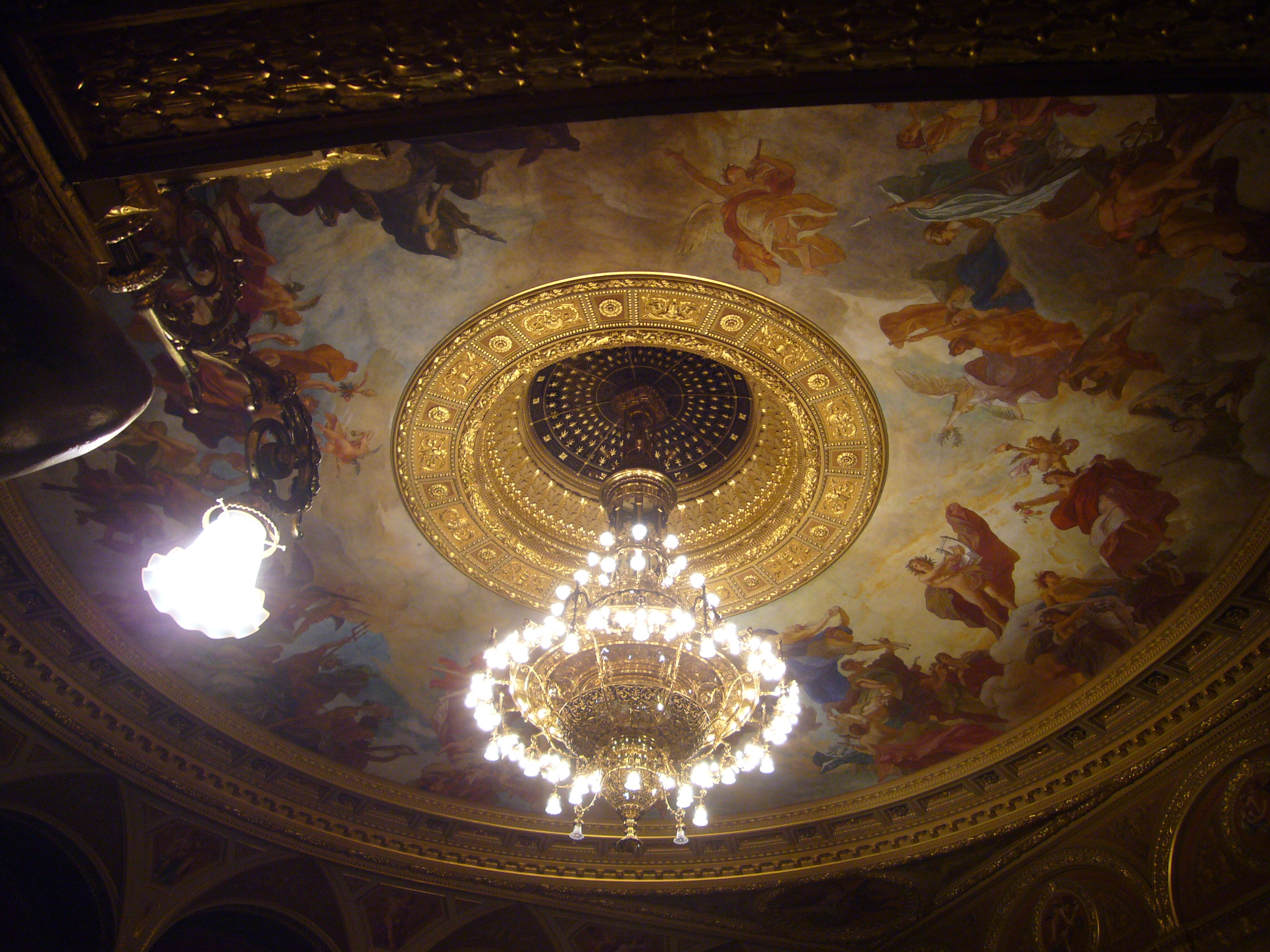
Painted Ceiling, Hungarian State Opera House

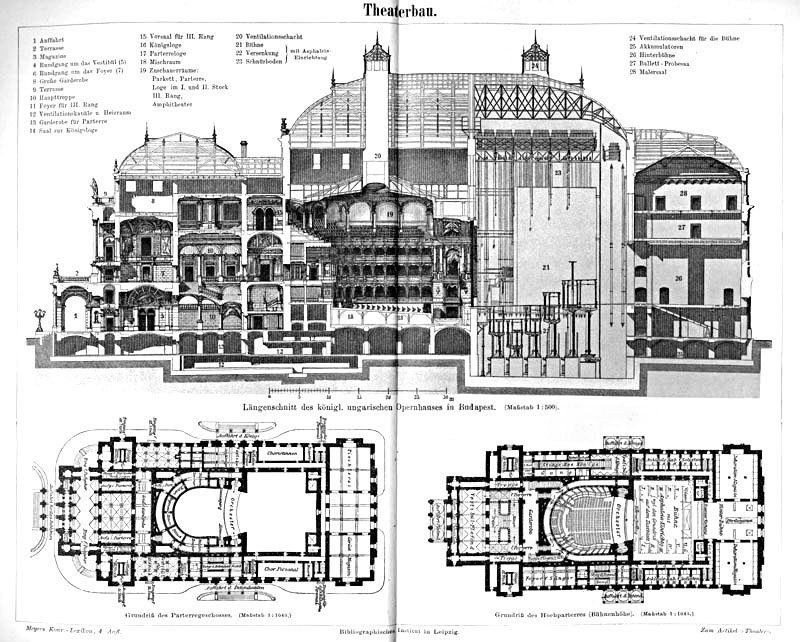
Section through the centre of the house

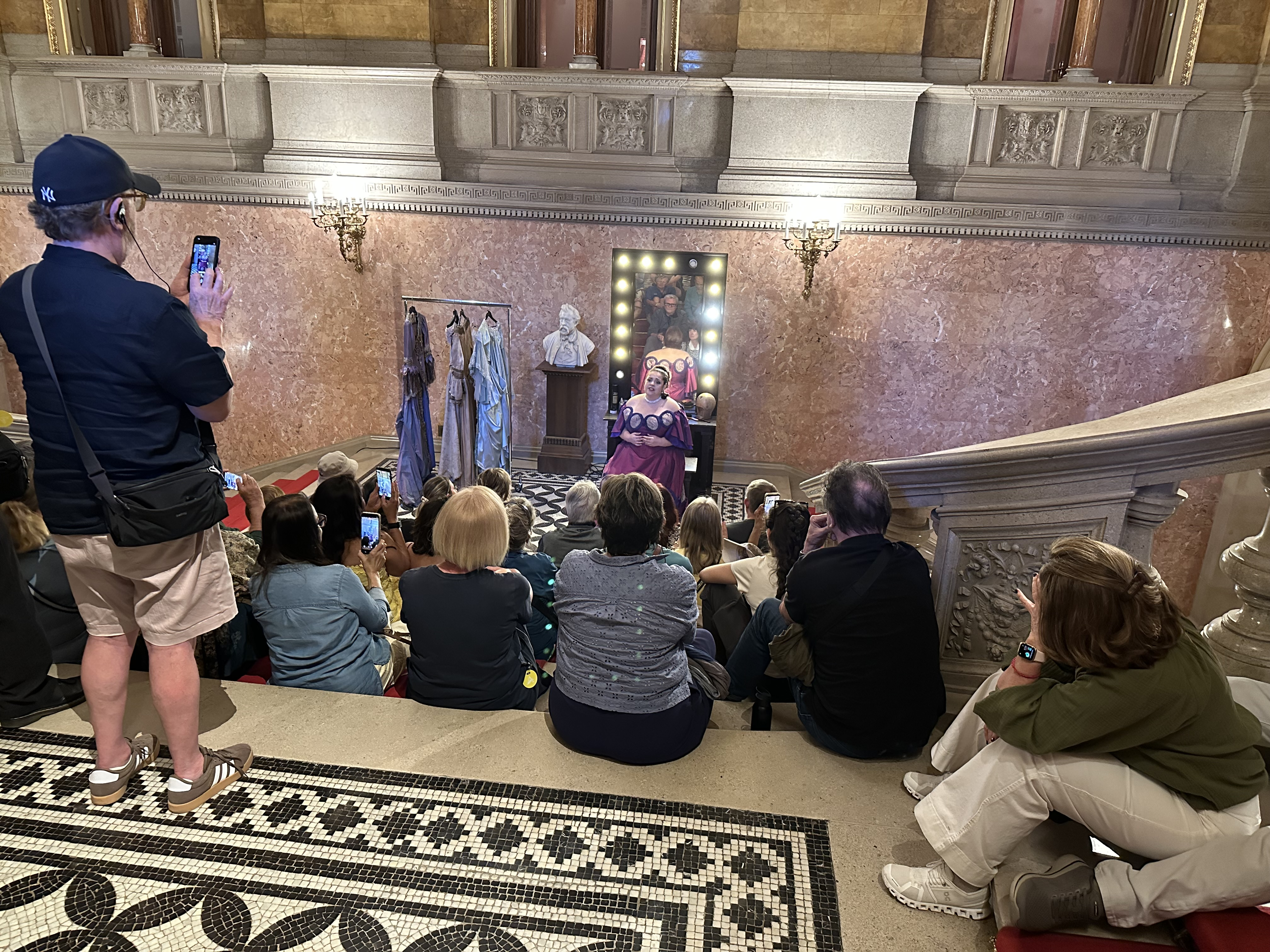
Guided tours end on the grand staircase with a costumed performance of a scene from an opera

The main hall is decorated with a bronze chandelier weighing 3050 kg. It illuminates a fresco by Károly Lotz, depicting the Greek gods on Olympus. The central stage proscenium arch employed the most modern technology of the time. It featured a revolving stage and metal hydraulic machinery.

The royal box is located centrally in the three-storey circle. It is decorated with sculptures symbolizing the four operatic voices - soprano, alto, tenor and bass.

== The company's second theatre ==
Today, a secondary building, which has been part of the Hungarian State Opera company since 1951, is the Erkel Theatre (renamed as such in 1953), which originally opened in 1911 as the "Népopera" (The People's Opera). It was closed in 1915, modernized with seating capacity reduced to 2,400, and reopened in 1917 as the "Városi Színház" (City Theatre). It fulfilled many functions over the years, including being a cinema, until it came under the control of the State Opera House. Significantly renovated in 1961, it functioned as a second venue for the company until 2007 when once again, closure and renovations took place until its reopening in 2013.

== See also ==
- Ferenc Erkel
- Hungarian National Ballet
- Budapest Philharmonic Orchestra
- Music of Budapest
