= Renee Botta =

Renee Botta is on the faculty of the Department of Media, Film & Journalism Studies at the University of Denver where she has conducted research on the relationship between media use and eating disorders among adolescents from diverse populations. She earned a Ph.D. in 1998 from the University of Wisconsin-Madison. At the University of Denver she teaches courses in health communication, mass communication & public relations in many different graduate and undergraduate courses. Her main focus of work away from the University has been about increasing sanitation and clean water in slums such as Kibera.

== Early life ==
Renee Botta earned her bachelor's degree from the University of Wisconsin-Madison in 1987, she also earned her master's degree in 1989 as well as a Ph.D. in 1998 from the University of Wisconsin-Madison. She is currently not the Chair of the Department of Media, Film & Journalism Studies at the University of Denver.

== Accomplishments ==
Renee is well known as the author of the 7th-most frequently cited article in Journal of Communication, which is one of the most prestigious academic journals in the world that publishes research on communication. You can find her published work on the International Communication Association website., In 1999 Botta contributed an article called; 'Television images and adolescent girls' body image disturbance' in the Journal of Communication. The article talks about the impact the media has had on people's view of body image as well as studies that Botta has done on eating disorders. Then in 2003 while at Cleveland State University Botta was a part of the Fulbright Program, which is an International education exchange program. She taught at the University of Zambia and conducted research on how people communicate about AIDS in their everyday life. Currently Renee Botta is the chair and Associate Professor in the Department of Media, Film & Journalism Studies at the University of Denver. Renee Botta's primary areas of expertise include health communication, communication campaigns, health and media effects, and international heath communication. She is also highly qualified in many other areas, which include but are not limited to: advertising, broadcast media, social psychology, human communication, women's issues, health and wellness, and the sanitation and hygiene in Africa. Renee Botta has made contributions to the book Taking a Bite Out of Crime The Impact of the National Citizens Crime Prevention Media Campaign which goes over topics such as crime prevention scholars, law enforcement practitioners, and media experts, and focuses on examining the power of the media to influence people's attitudes and behaviors.

== Global Involvement ==
Sanitation has become an increasingly large problem for small informal villages, better known as slums all around the world. The problem has increased to the point where one in every five children die before the age of five in the informal settlement of Kibera in Nairobi. The cause can be attributed to lack of clean water. Botta worked with other Faculty from the University of Denver, who include Randall Kuhn, Karen Loeb, and Peter Van Arsdale, as well as students from University of Nairobi to develop a sustainable and scalable model for sanitation and clean water. The main focus for Botta and her team were to improve the health conditions as well as conditions economically in Kibera through their model

== Research ==
The solution that Botta and her team came up with consists of a "stool" method. The top 'seat' of the stool consist of facility, infrastructure, and the best technologies for waste removal, water storage, and water purification. A few of these modern technology are water catchment systems, bio-gas, and gravity bed leach fields. Their solution, however, consists of not only technology and infrastructure but also the support of governance from public and private sectors, business planning which influences sustainable management, and finally health and hygiene training for the people of the slums. These three areas make up the 'legs' of the stool. With this system, sustainable operations and improved health are promoted. Botta's research in Kibera helped to educate the native women living in the slums on how to treat their drinking water and improve the overall health of their families. The family's houses contained no running water. The DU project was granted $300,000. With that money they provided water, flushing toilets, and showers.
