= Juan Rodríguez Botas =

Spanish painter

Juan Rodríguez Botas (1880–1917) is considered the first Canarian impressionist.

== See also ==
- Tenerife#Painting.
