= Kimmo Pikkarainen =

Finnish ice hockey player (born 1976)

Kimmo Pikkarainen (born December 19, 1976) is a Finnish retired professional ice hockey defender. He most recently played for Milano Rossoblu Hockey Club, in Milan, Italy.

== Early life ==
Pikkarainen was born on December 19, 1976, in Helsinki. As a teenager, he played for the Jokerit under-18 hockey team. While playing for the club in 1996, they won the Finnish Youth Championship.
