= Bergonzio Botta =

Milanese master of ceremonies

Bergonzio Botta (c. 1454 – 5 January 1504) was a Milanese functionary. He served as the master of ceremonies of Ludovico Sforza from at least 1489 and, after Ludovico became Duke of Milan, as his treasurer from 1494 to 1499. During the Italian Wars after 1499, he was aligned with the French. He is most famous today for one his earliest recorded public acts. In 1489, he organized what is regarded as one of the earliest ballet performances.

== Life ==
=== Master of ceremonies ===
Botta was born into a noble family of Pavia. His father's name was Giovanni and his brother Giacomo was the ambassador of the Duchy of Milan to the Holy See. A letter of the papal nunzio Giacomo Gherardi indicates that Botta was one of Ludovico Sforza's protégés by 1489. In that year, he held a banquet in honour of the marriage of Duke Gian Galeazzo Sforza and Isabella of Aragon in his house in Tortona. The guests were entertained by a series of dances accompanying the courses of the meal. This is often considered a seminal event in the history of ballet, insofar as the whole event was choreographed under a common theme. The only contemporary account of this event is found in the work of Tristano Calco. Calco presents Botta as a self-made man who had acquired his wealth through skill.

=== Treasurer ===
By 1491, Botta was working in the ducal financial administration under Ludovico's regency. He rose to become master of general revenue. After Ludovico became duke, Botta advocated highly unpopular policies for raising funds and was active in their collection in 1493–1494. Marino Sanuto the Younger records that when the nobleman Francesco Bernardino Visconti accused Ludovico of ruining the state with exactions, Botta came to the duke's defence. The chronicler Ambrogio da Paullo echoed Visconti in blaming Botta, in part, for the ruin of the state under Ludovico.

In 1499, as a French army approached Milan and with Ludovico having fled to Germany, Botta took refuge in the Castello Sforzesco. He favoured setting up a republic in Ludovico's absence to buy time. He was probably a party to the negotitations that surrendered the city to the French on 17 September. He left the castle the next day.

=== Under the French ===
After Ascanio Sforza seized power with popular support on 2 February 1500, the unpopular Botta was accused of plotting his assassination. According to Giovanni Andrea Prato, his palace was attacked by a violent mob of 4,000, but his sizeable guard, which he had begun assembling in August 1499, prevented looting. He was arrested on 24 February 1500 and fined a large sum. He returned to favour with the return of the French governor, Gian Giacomo Trivulzio, in April. In 1502, he played a role in a failed French attempt on Bellinzona. That year, he married his daughter Apollonia to Filippo of the House of Borromeo, providing a dowry of 24,000 imperial lire. He died in Milan on 5 January 1504.

Botta's wealth and prestige are indicated by his daughter's marriage and dowry and his own ability to maintain an armed following. His second wife and widow, Madonna Daria Botta, hosted King Louis XII of France in her house in 1515 and was brought back to France by him as a valuable hostage in 1516. Botta also founded and endowed a college at the University of Pavia.

== Bibliography ==
- Gagné, John (2017). "Collecting Women: Three French Kings and Manuscripts of Empire in the Italian Wars". I Tatti Studies in the Italian Renaissance. 20 (1): 127–184. doi:10.1086/691389. S2CID 194676551.
- Gagné, John (2020). Milan Undone: Contested Sovereignties in the Italian Wars. Harvard University Press. doi:10.4159/9780674249936. ISBN 978-0-674-24993-6.
- Gamberini, Andrea (2018). "Officialdom in the Early Renaissance State: A Channel of Social Mobility? Hints from the Case of Lombardy under the Visconti and Sforza". In Sandro Carocci; Isabella Lazzarini (eds.). Social Mobility in Medieval Italy (1100–1500). Viella Libreria Editrice. pp. 139–150.
- Merzagora, Paolo (2002). "Il Palazzo per Bergonzio Botta a Milano". In Christoph Frommel; Luisa Giordano; Richard Schofield (eds.). Bramante Milanese. Marsilio. pp. 261–280.
- Steinitz, Kate Trauman (1961). "The Voyage of Isabella d'Aragon: From Naples to Milan, January 1489". Bibliothèque d'Humanisme et Renaissance. 23 (1): 17–33. JSTOR 20674243.
- Zapperi, R; Ricci Albani, D. (1971). "Botta, Bergonzio". Dizionario Biografico degli Italiani, Volume 13: Borremans–Brancazolo (in Italian). Rome: Istituto dell'Enciclopedia Italiana. ISBN 978-8-81200032-6.
