= Giulio Camillo =

Italian philosopher

- Born: c. 1480; Friuli, Republic of Venice
- Died: 15 May 1544; Milan, Duchy of Milan
- Other name: Giulio Camillo Delminio
- Education: University of Padua

Giulio "Delminio" Camillo (c. 1480 – 1544) was an Italian Renaissance philosopher. He is best known for his speculative Theatre of Memory (Teatro della Memoria), as outlined in his posthumously published work L'Idea del Theatro. The utopian aim of this project was to generate a sophisticated architectural representation of all knowledge that would allow its memorisation through a structured set of symbolic visual associations. Despite his search for patronage, Camillo's ambitions for the full elaboration of a universal Theatre of Memory appear to have remained largely unrealised.

His work and legacy have been interpreted in terms of a tradition of 'Theatres of Memory', for example, in Frances Yates’s influential book, The Art of Memory (1966). Creative artists who have subsequently taken inspiration from Camillo and the concept of Theatres of Memory include Ted Hughes (1992), Carlota Caulfield (2003), and Hilary Mantel (2009); visual artists Jean Dubuffet (1977) and Bill Viola (1985); and composer John Buller (2003).

== Biography ==
Camillo was born around 1480 in Friuli and probably spent his childhood in either Portogruaro or Udine. He took his family name, Delminio, from the birthplace of his father, in Dalmatia (in present-day Croatia). He studied philosophy and jurisprudence at the University of Padua in the years around 1500, and subsequently taught eloquence and logic at San Vito, an academy in Friuli. In 1508 he was involved in the short-lived Accademia Liviana at Pordenone. The academy attracted an eclectic mix of brilliant and radical thinkers. Here, Camillo would have come in contact with astronomer and physician, Girolamo Fracastoro, and the poets, Giovanni Cotta and Andrea Navagero.

Around the first decade of the sixteenth century Camillo lived in Venice, where he was in close contact with some of the most influential writers and artists of Europe. He stayed near the house of the famous printer, Aldus Manutius, in the Sestiere di San Polo, in the centre of the city. He knew the philologist Desiderius Erasmus (although Erasmus and Viglius did not show much affection for Camillo's esoteric ideas) and worked with the painter Titian. He was part of the cultural circle that included Pietro Aretino and Pietro Bembo and had personal ties with the architect Sebastiano Serlio and his family. During this time, Camillo spent considerable care in charting regional differences in Friulian dialects and championed the local use of Italian, rather than Ladin. Throughout this time he also worked on his ideas for a Theatre of Memory.

Camillo attended the coronation of Charles V in 1519 and is believed to have held a chair of Dialectics at the University of Bologna from around 1521 to 1525.

In 1530, Camillo journeyed to Paris at the invitation of Francis I of France. He produced a manuscript titled Theatro della Sapientia in 1530, for Francis, in which his ideas for the Theatre of Memory were outlined. He impressed Francis and was given funds to develop his ideas, remaining in France till around 1537.

Eventually, remuneration from Francis I began to dry up and Camillo decided to return to Italy. During the latter part of 1543, or very early in 1544, he accepted an offer to go to Milan. Here, after much persuasion, Camillo finally dictated his plan of the Theatre of Memory. The manuscript was completed early in February 1544. Three months later, on 15 May, Camillo died. L’ Idea del Theatro was finally published in 1550, in Florence, by Lorenzo Torrentino.

== L’Idea del Theatro ==
Camillo's published output is small and L'Idea del Theatro is his most well-known work. L'Idea del theatro (The Idea of the Theater), opens with a warning concerning an ancient tradition of esoteric writing:

The most ancient and wisest of writers have always been accustomed to recommending to their writings the secrets of God under obscure veils, so that they be not intended, unless by those who (as says Christ) have ears to hear--i.e. who by God are elected to intend his own most saintly mysteries. And Melissus [of Samos] says that the eyes of vulgar wills [animi] cannot suffer the rays of divinity. That is confirmed with the example of Moses...

Elsewhere Camillo notes that:

"By the ancients thus it was custom that those same philosophers who taught and showed to dear disciples profound doctrines, having clearly declared them, would cover them with fables, so that the covers they made would keep the doctrines hidden: so that they would not be profaned".

At the end of the chapter titled "Le Gorgoni", Camillo identifies the faculty of "intending" with the "practical intellect" ("intelletto prattico"), which is elsewhere explicitly distinguished from the "acting intellect" ("intelletto agente"), as well as from Cicero's "the force of intelligence," which is vulgarly referred to as "ingenuity". In Camillo's "Theatro" each "image...will signify for us intelligible things that cannot fall under the senses, but that we can only imagine or intend illuminated by the acting intellect". While "Intellect is of the spirit", the "acting intellect" (Aristotle) is said to correspond to Plato's "mind" ("mente") and Augustine's "superior part" ("portion superiore"). In virtue of this intellect, we can "intend". The practical intellect, on the other hand, indicates "possessing" ("possedere") by "having already apprehended". In short, there are "three intellects" in us: 1) a "possible" ("possibile") or "passive" ("passibile") intellect, or ingenuity entailing the "ability" to intend; 2) the intellective faculty per se, or "intending" as "practical intellect"; and 3) the "active intellect" that makes us intend, just as the Sun allows us to see all things beneath it. Camillo argues against "philosophers ignorant of God" who identify the "active intellect" with human reason, insofar as this one is usually absent from men, who are merely capable of it. The "active intellect" must reside safely and eternally "in God", so as to safeguard man's capacity to reason. As other ancient mythic "images" or "symbols," that of the three "Gorgoni" is used to protect the verities of the mind, or "the mystery of truth" ("il mistero della verita") from being profaned. By casting the principle of reason in the authoritative form of God, philosophers who do not ignore God defend reason from being turned into an instrument of the physical senses below it.

== Notes on the text ==
Camillo notes that L’Idea del Theatro is concerned with ‘the eternal aspect of all things’. The book is arranged in seven sections that chart the creation of the world. Camillo speaks of a system that, as he says, makes ‘scholars into spectators’. He is imagining a theatre in its original sense – as a place in which a spectacle unfolds:

Following the order of the creation of the world, we shall place on the first levels the more natural things…those we can imagine to have been created before all other things by divine decree. Then we shall arrange from level to level those that followed after, in such a way that in the seventh, that is, the last and highest level shall sit all the arts… not by reason of unworthiness, but by reason of chronology, since these were the last to have been found by men.

Camillo suggests that the world was made of ‘primary matter’. This primary matter was sometimes called ‘hyle’; it is the material of all that is manifest. Camillo thought that by reducing knowledge into its constituent parts, you could come closer to comprehending hyle, the original essence, and consequently understand what makes the world tick. Likewise (but in reverse) through comprehending the universe, you would understand its essential ingredients. His key to this was in the creation of a symbolic system that both represented the essence of material, as well as the relationships between the essences that allowed the universe to maintain its being. The ‘idea of the Theatre’ was fundamentally a structure of conceptual relationships rather than a building of wood or stone, and it is on that level that Camillo's work bears most fruit. The Theatre is to be understood in terms of time and space - a spatial representation of chronology.

The entire Theatre, says Camillo, rests on Solomon's Seven Pillars of Wisdom. On the Seven Pillars rest the planets, which govern, or administrate, ‘cause and effect’. Camillo names these planets: the moon, Mercury, Venus, Mars, Jupiter and Saturn. He omits the name of the earth. Arranged in an ascending order from the planets, and affected by their influence, are a further six levels, which, broadly speaking, represent a gradual development from nature to art. These upper levels are named: The Banquet, The Cave, The Gorgons, Pasiphae, The Sandals of Mercury and Prometheus. The Banquet and the Cave, are the most ‘elemental’ of the levels; these are the levels where creation first began. The levels of the Gorgons, and Pasiphae, are where the ‘inner’ man is revealed in relation to the cosmos; these levels are part nature, part art. The levels of the Sandals of Mercury and Prometheus are concerned specifically with man as an active agent within the world, or art and man.

== Camillo and Erasmus ==
Desiderius Erasmus, the philologist, probably met Camillo in Venice around 1506–9. Erasmus mentions "sharing a mattress" with Camillo as well naming him in his satirical Ciceronianus (1528). Erasmus was scathing of Camillo's work, and in a letter dated 5 July 1532 talks about the Theatre in terms of it being able to excite as great a "tragedy in study" as that which "Luther produced in religion".

Camillo's response to Erasmus, Trattato dell’ Imitatione, written in Paris, was published in the year of Camillo's death, 1544.

== Art of memory ==
Giulio Camillo, posthumously, was referred to by a number of artists and writers, including Achille Bocchi, Ludovico Ariosto and Jean-Jacques Rousseau. More recently, his work has been interpreted in terms of a tradition of ‘Theatres of Memory’, for example, in Frances Yates’s influential book, The Art of Memory (1966). This tradition has inspired artists from many disparate disciplines, amongst them the writers Ted Hughes (1992), Carlota Caulfield (2003), and Hilary Mantel (2009); visual artists Jean Dubuffet (1977) and Bill Viola (1985); and composer John Buller (2003).
