= Srijon Chowdhury =

Bangladeshi born american contemporary painter

- Born: 1987 (age 38–39); Dhaka, Bangladesh
- Education: University of Minnesota Twin Cities (BFA); Otis College of Art and Design (MFA)
- Occupation: Painter
- Website: srijonchowdhury.com

Srijon Chowdhury (born 1987) is an American contemporary surrealist painter who mixes realism and symbolism with mythology to create his works. Chowdhury lives and works in Portland, Oregon.

== Early life and education ==
Srijon Chowdhury was born in Dhaka, Bangladesh. His father Akku Chowdhury is a trustee of National Liberation War Museum board and a business personality of Bangladesh. In 2009, Chowdhury received his Bachelors in Studio Art from the University of Minnesota Twin Cities and his Masters in Fine Art in 2013 from Otis College of Art and Design.

== Work and career ==
Chowdhury's work characteristically includes art historical references, often incorporating religion, myth, and symbolism. He works with topics from poetry, the Bible and the occult. Chowdhury's historical references have included inclusion of poetry (William Blake), subjects inspired by Medieval Manuscripts, and references to a proposed architectural structure by 16th-century philosopher Giulio Camillo.

Chowdhury has received numerous grants for his work including one in 2018 from the Andy Warhol Foundation.

In 2022, Chowdhury had his debut solo museum exhibition at the Frye Museum in Seattle, Washington.
