= Eleonore Carboniers =

Eleonore Carboniers (fl. 1550–1584) was a Dutch poet and the wife of Flemish painter and writer Lucas de Heere (1534-1584).

== Biography ==
Eleonore (or Eleonora) Carboniers was probably born in Veere, on the island Walcheren, as the daughter of burgomaster Pieter Carboniers. She met De Heere in 1550, when painted her portrait. After De Heere, who was then 15 or 16 years old, had finished her portrait in his workshop in Ghent, he sent it back, accompanied by a love poem. Carboniers and De Heere started a correspondence and wanted to get married, but her parents objected because he was not rich enough.

After her father Pieter died in 1560, they married and Eleonore Carboniers went to live with the painter in Ghent. From 1566 or 1568 to 1577 they lived in England, having fled the persecution of Protestants by the Spanish rulers in Flanders. From 1577 to 1582 they again lived in Ghent, in relative wealth, but then they had to flee again, presumably to France and to her native Zeeland. Lucas de Heere died in 1584: Eleonore Carboniers survived her husband, the last mention of her is in October 1584 in Middelburg. It is unknown where she lived afterwards or when she died, and equally unknown is whether the couple had any children.

A poetry collection by Lucas de Heere, Den hof en boomgaerd der poësien (The garden and orchard of poetry), was published in 1565. It contains three works about his wife (a sonnet and two letters), but also two works written by Eleonore Carboniers, a 5-line introductory poem and the Dutch translation of a sonnet, originally written by De Heere in French. It is considered to be the first sonnet published in Dutch by a woman author.

The sonnet is titled Sonet ghetranslateert by d'huusvrouwe vanden Autheur, uut een Françoys sonet bi hem ghemaect op een schilderye van M. Willem Key t'Andwerpen: twee ghesellen spreken tsamen (Sonnet translated by the housewife of the Author, from a French sonnet made by him after a painting by mr. Willem Key in Antwerp: 2 companions talk together). It describes in the octave the comments of two men upon seeing a naked women, and then in the sestet their realisation that they were fooled by a realistic painting by Willem Key, a contemporary of De Heere and Carboniers.
