= Valois Tapestries =

Series of tapestries depicting festivities at the court of France

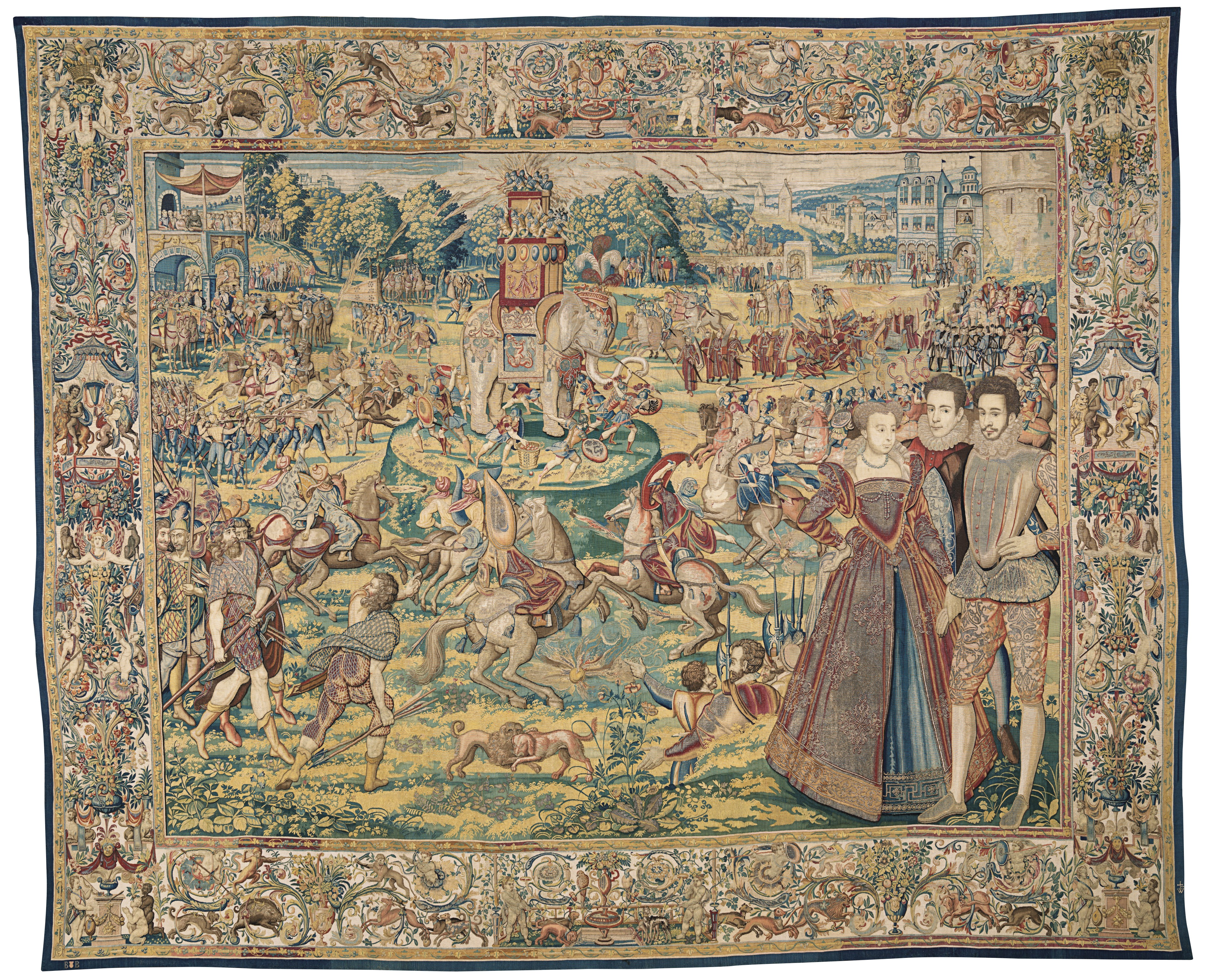
Mascarade à l'éléphant, also known as Elephant (387 x 640 cm.; 152 x 252 in.)

The Valois Tapestries (Dutch: Valois tapijten) are a series of eight large tapestries depicting festivities or "magnificences" held by Catherine de' Medici's Royal Courts in the second half of the 16th century. The tapestries were primarily modeled on drawings by Antoine Caron, but to Caron's distant views of large panoramas crowded with figures much larger portraits of leading persons at the French court have been added in the foreground, usually to the side, as well as elaborate borders.

They were produced by teams of weavers in the Spanish Netherlands, probably in Brussels or Antwerp, shortly after 1580. A number of great artists and artisans worked on the creation of these tapestries but today we are left with nothing but theories and speculation to their identities. Scholars such as Frances Yates and Jean Coural have developed nuanced theories backed by solid evidence to identify these unknown contributors, and also the political meaning of the tapestries, but research has yet to confirm many of these findings. These works display surprisingly intimate and personal moments within the royal inner circle clashing against the busy backdrops of these lavish festivals.

The tapestries are now in the Uffizi Museum in Florence, Italy.

== Design and construction ==
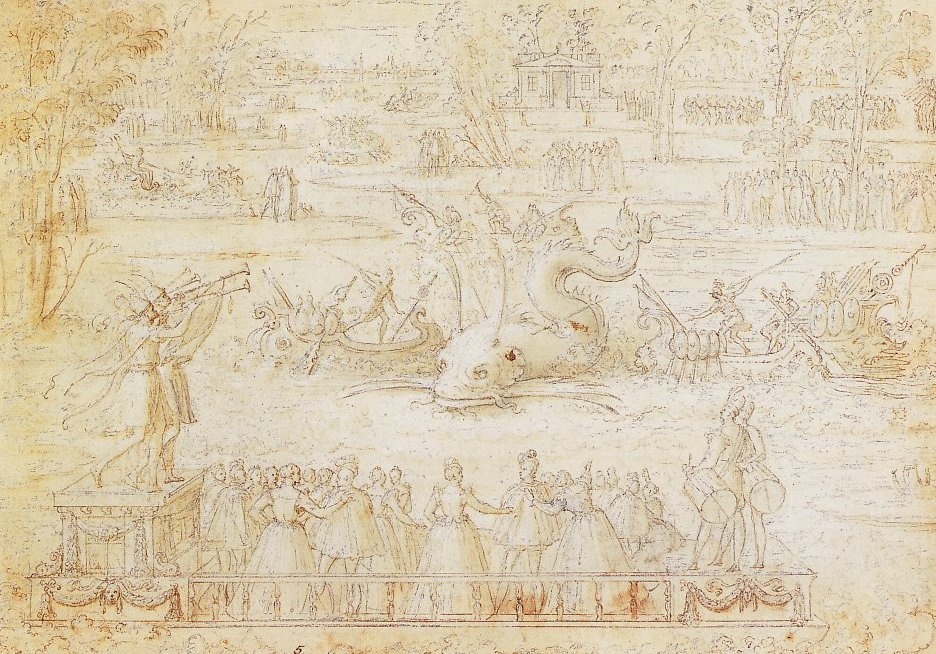
Water Festival at Bayonne. Antoine Caron's designs lack the foreground figures of the finished tapestries.

The tapestries are based on six (possibly eight) designs drawn by the artist Antoine Caron during the reign of King Charles IX of France (1560–1574). These were modified by a second artist, who reveals a strong personality of their own, to include groups of full-length figures in the foreground. Historian Frances Yates believed that this second artist was the influential Lucas de Heere, this claim holds grounds and is backed by solid evidence but is nevertheless highly contested and debated among historians.

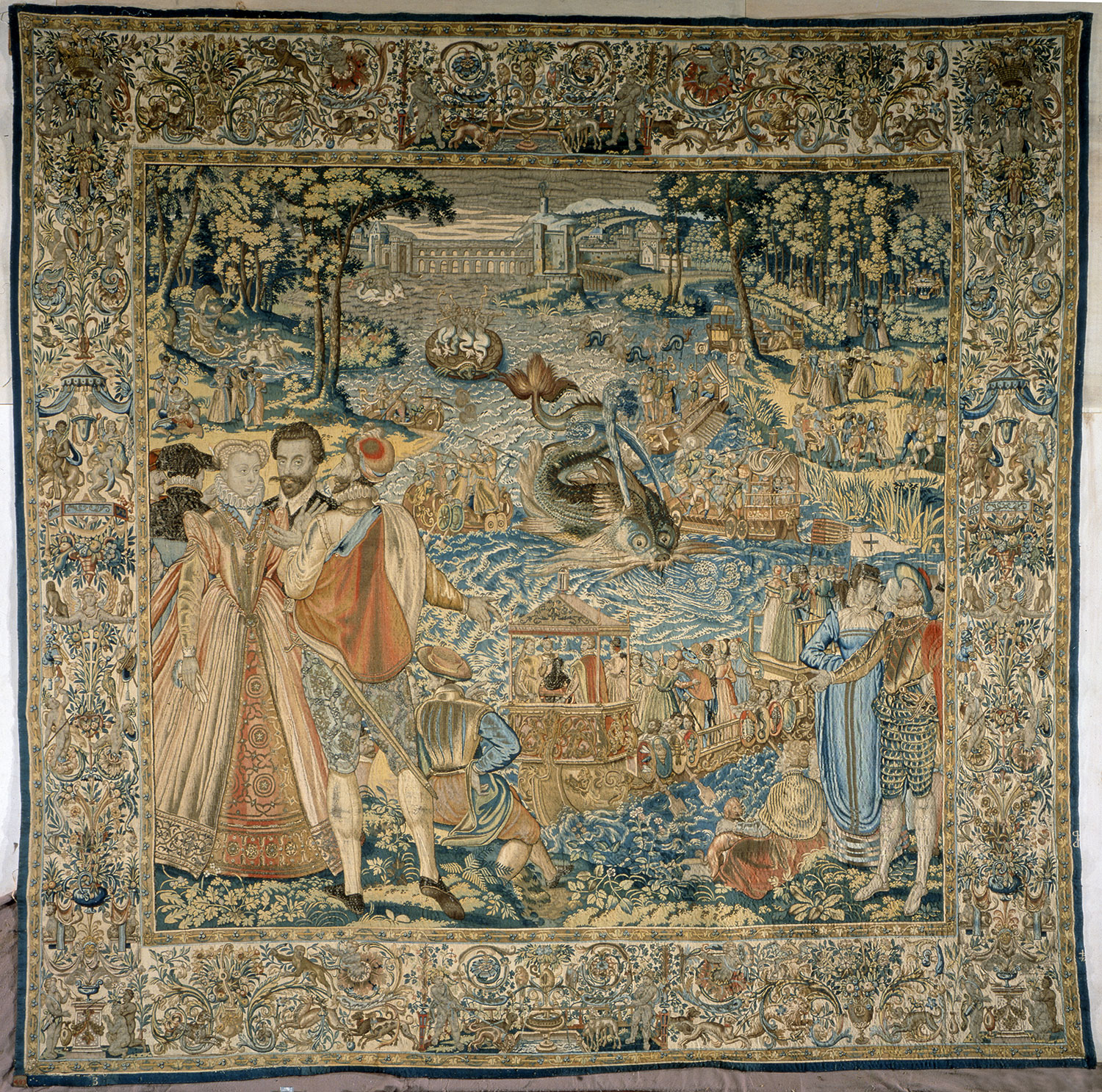
This tapestry depicts festivities at the meeting of the Valois and Habsburg courts at Bayonne in 1565; the harpooned whale spouted red wine.

=== Composition ===
The eight tapestries can be distinctly divided into several sections. Initially, the original sketches by Antoine Caron form the chaotic backgrounds of each piece, acting as the foundational layers for the creations. Over this chaotic backdrop, nearly separate portraits were later added by a second artist, enhancing the narrative of the tapestry cycle and the imagery of the immediate royal circle. Finally, each tapestry features incredibly detailed borders, likely crafted entirely by a third artist employed by the producing workshop. Although the borders have been largely understudied, they remain crucial for identifying the origins and creators of these tapestries.

=== Themes and iconography ===
The artists seem to have consulted written accounts of Catherine de' Medici's court festivals. Some of the entertainments recorded in the tapestries can be identified with known events, such as the festivals mounted at Fontainebleau and at Bayonne during Charles IX's royal progress of 1564–65; and the ball held for the Polish ambassadors at the Tuileries in 1573. Particularly lavish were the tournaments and fêtes held in 1565 in Bayonne, near the Spanish border of France, where Catherine de' Medici met with her daughter Elisabeth, Queen of Spain, amidst rituals of display from both courts. The latest event identifiable in the tapestries was held in 1573 at the Tuileries, where Catherine laid on a ball for ambassadors from the Polish governing council, who had elected her son Henry as king of Poland. The costumes worn by the courtiers in the tapestries have been dated to not later than c. 1580.

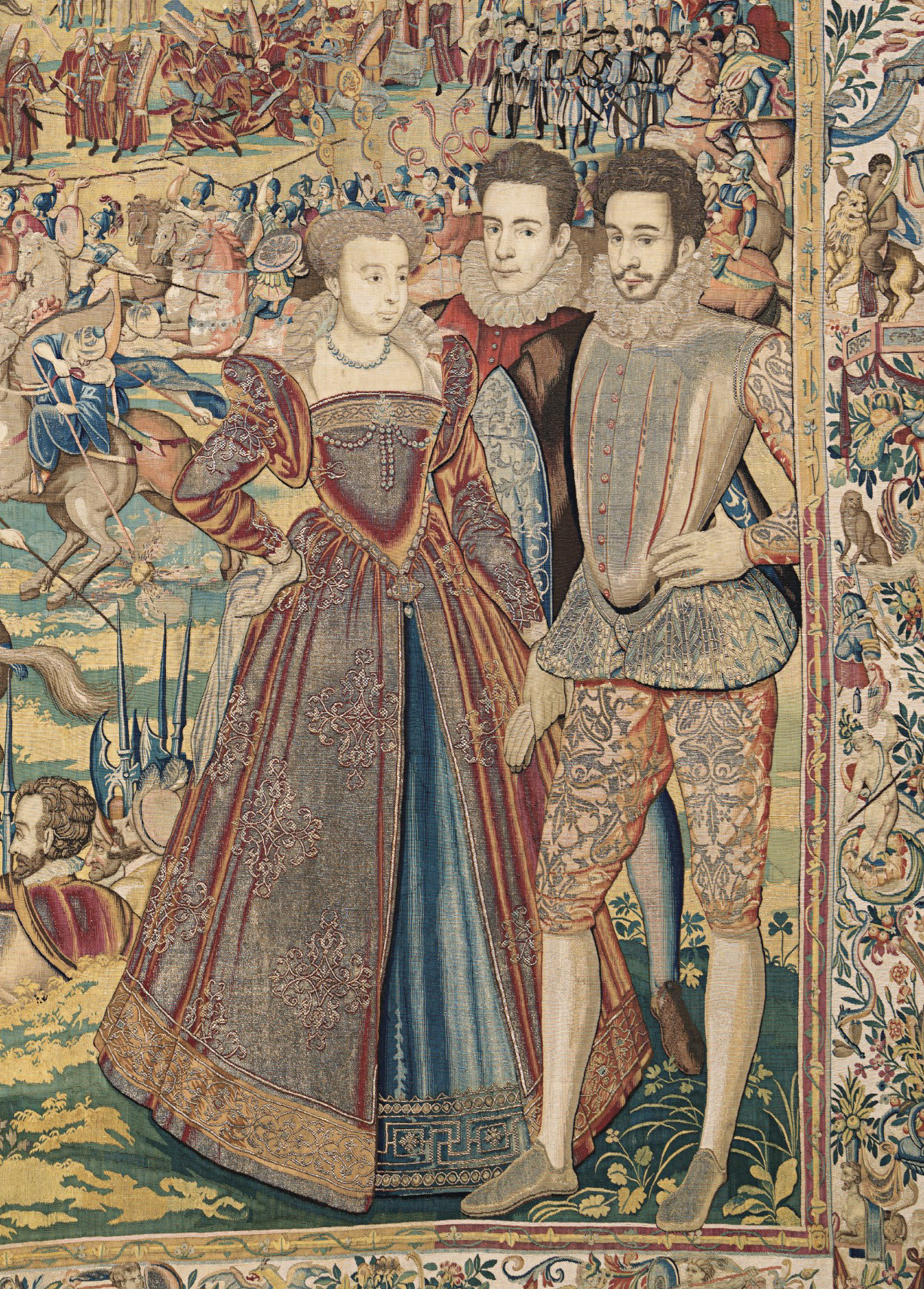
Example of the unnamed artist's inclusion of full bodied portraits against Caron's chaotic backdrops. Marguerite de Valois and her brother François, Duke of Anjou depicted in the Valois Tapestries, Elephant.

For Catherine de' Medici, who masterminded these occasions and may have ordered the tapestries that commemorated them, such entertainments were worth their colossal expense, since they served a political purpose. Presiding over the royal government at a time when the French monarchy was in steep decline, she set out to show not only the French people but foreign courts that the Valois monarchy was as prestigious and magnificent as it had been during the reigns of Francis I and her husband Henry II.

At the same time, she believed these elaborate entertainments and sumptuous court rituals, which incorporated martial sports and tournaments of many kinds, would occupy her feuding nobles and distract them from fighting against each other to the detriment of the country and the royal authority. Catherine also exercised her own creative gifts in the devising of the court festivals. Biographer Leonie Frieda suggests that she, "more than anyone, inaugurated the fantastic entertainments for which later French monarchs also became renowned".

=== Notable figures ===
Most of the full-length figures in the foreground of the tapestries are recognizable as members of the French royal family and court. Francis, Duke of Anjou is featured prominently in some of the tapestries, and Catherine de' Medici, dressed in her widow's black, occupies the central position in all of the tapestries except one. Catherine's daughter Marguerite de Valois can also be seen.

One absentee from the tapestries is King Charles IX of France, who was on the throne at the time of the events depicted, but who had died (1574) by the time the hangings were woven. Yates speculates that the Protestant creators of the tapestries deliberately cut him out because of his involvement in the St. Bartholomew's Day massacre of 1572, in which thousands of French Protestants, or Huguenots, were slaughtered on his orders. Caron's original drawings for the tapestries, of which six survive, show Charles IX taking part in the festivities. It is the later artist who removed Charles from the designs and added the figures in the foreground who relate to the court of Charles's successor Henry III.

== Descriptions ==
The collection of eight tapestries has no formal title, but is usually called the "Valois tapestries" and sometimes the "Fêtes des Valois". The tapestries, none of which has an official name are described and summarized in the table below.

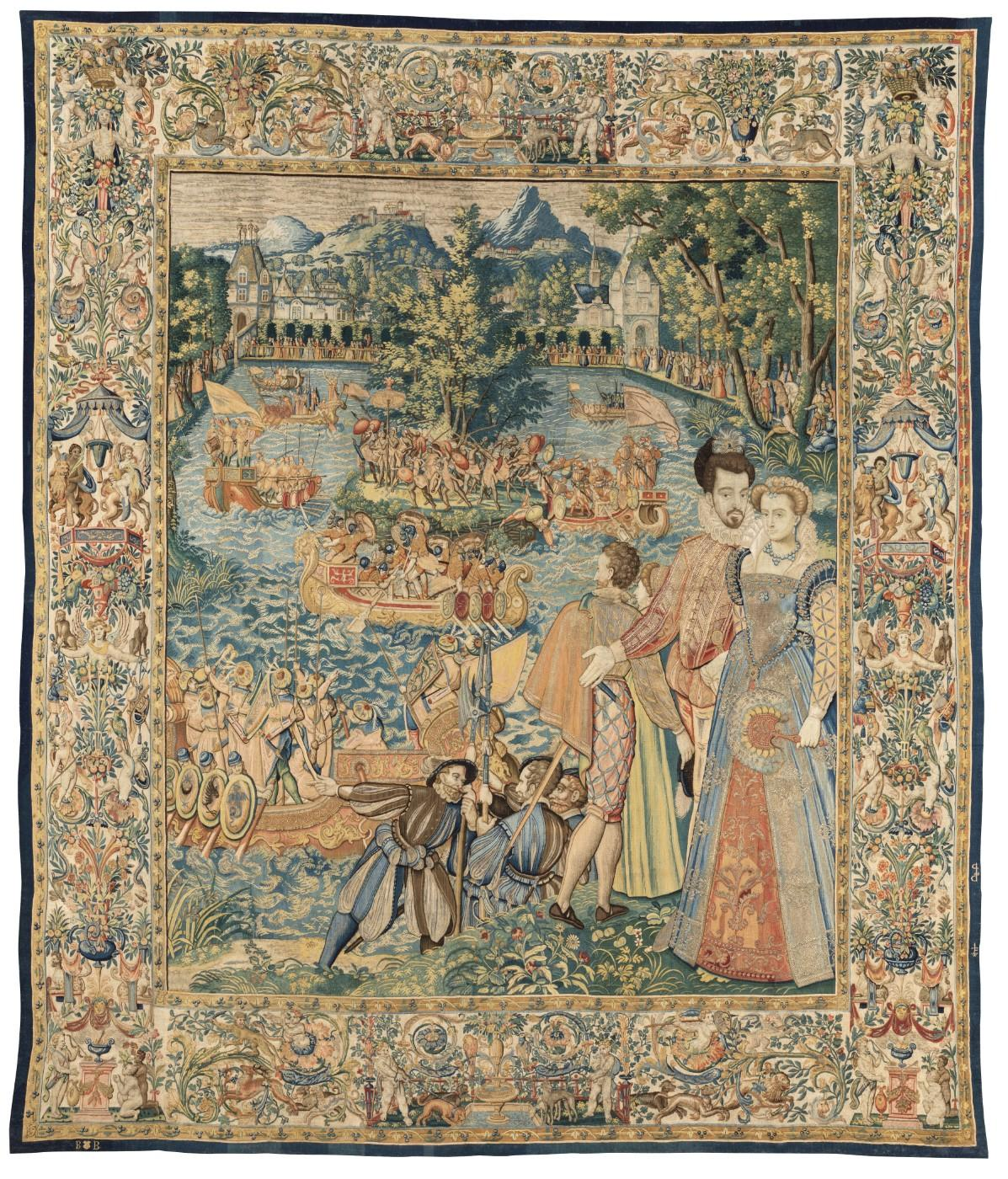
Attaque de Vue devant le château de Fontainebleau, also known as Fontainebleau (404 x 344 cm.; 159 x 135 in.)

Attaque de Vue devant le château de Fontainebleau, also known as Fontainebleau (404 x 344 cm.; 159 x 135 in.) depicts a mock battle held in late June 1564 at the Château de Fontainebleau, as part of the celebrations occurring before the departure of the Grand Tour made throughout France by the young King Charles IX and Catherine de' Medici to formally confirm the young king's rule. In this staged battle, a number of women are "imprisoned" in a faux château on an island in a small, man-made lake while the king and his brothers work to free them. Catherine de' Medici, King Henry III, Louise of Lorraine, Margaret of Valois, King Henry IV, and Francis, Duke of Anjou are featured prominently.

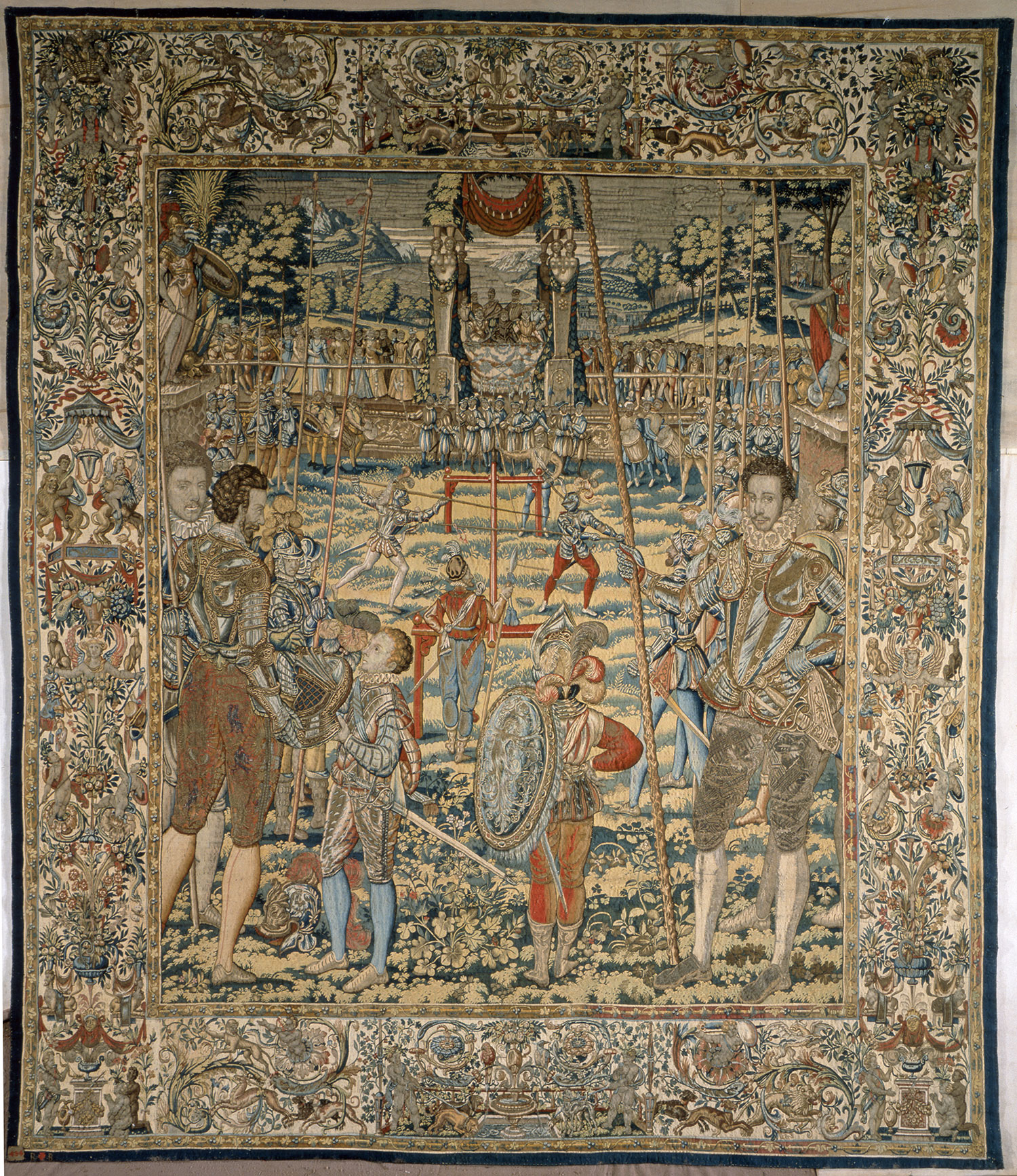
Combat à la barrière, also known as Barriers (386 x 328 cm.; 152 x 129 in.)

Combat à la barrière, also known as Barriers (386 x 328 cm.; 152 x 129 in.) is thought to depict lance games that occurred frequently at the Palace of Fontainebleau in 1564 and 1565 likely also evoking the return of King Charles IX and Catherine de' Medici from their Grand Tour. Duke Francis of Anjou, youngest son of Catherine de' Medici, is depicted in the foreground holding a lance and gazing out toward the viewer. Catherine de' Medici is featured reigning over the games in central pavilion. This is one of the two tapestries that does not have a corresponding original sketch by Antonie Caron.

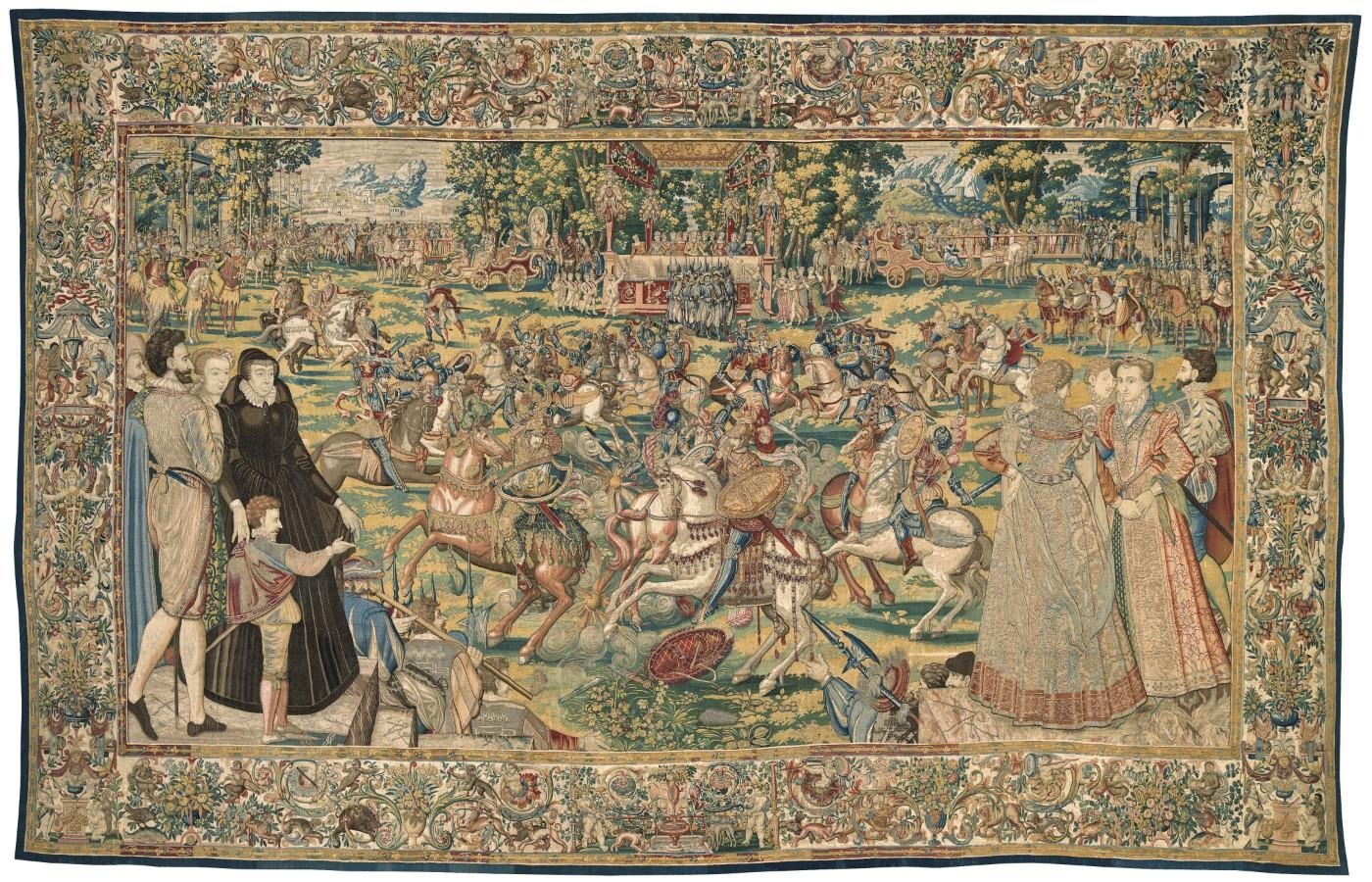
Carrousel des chevaliers bretons et irlandais à Bayonne, also known as Tournament (391 x 611 cm.; 154 x 241 in.)

Carrousel des chevaliers bretons et irlandais à Bayonne, also known as Tournament (391 x 611 cm.; 154 x 241 in.) depicts a ballet de cour ("court ballet"), an elaborate, choreographed performance. In this case, it depicts a court ballet held on June 25, 1565, as part of the Bayonne celebrations, in which knights representing the forces of Love and Virtue do battle. In the background, the cardinal virtues of Courage, Justice, Prudence, and Temperance ride in one chariot, while Cupid and Venus ride in another chariot surrounded by a host of putti. Depicted in the tapestry are Catherine de' Medici (in mourning), Margaret of Valois, King Henry IV, and Louise of Lorraine.

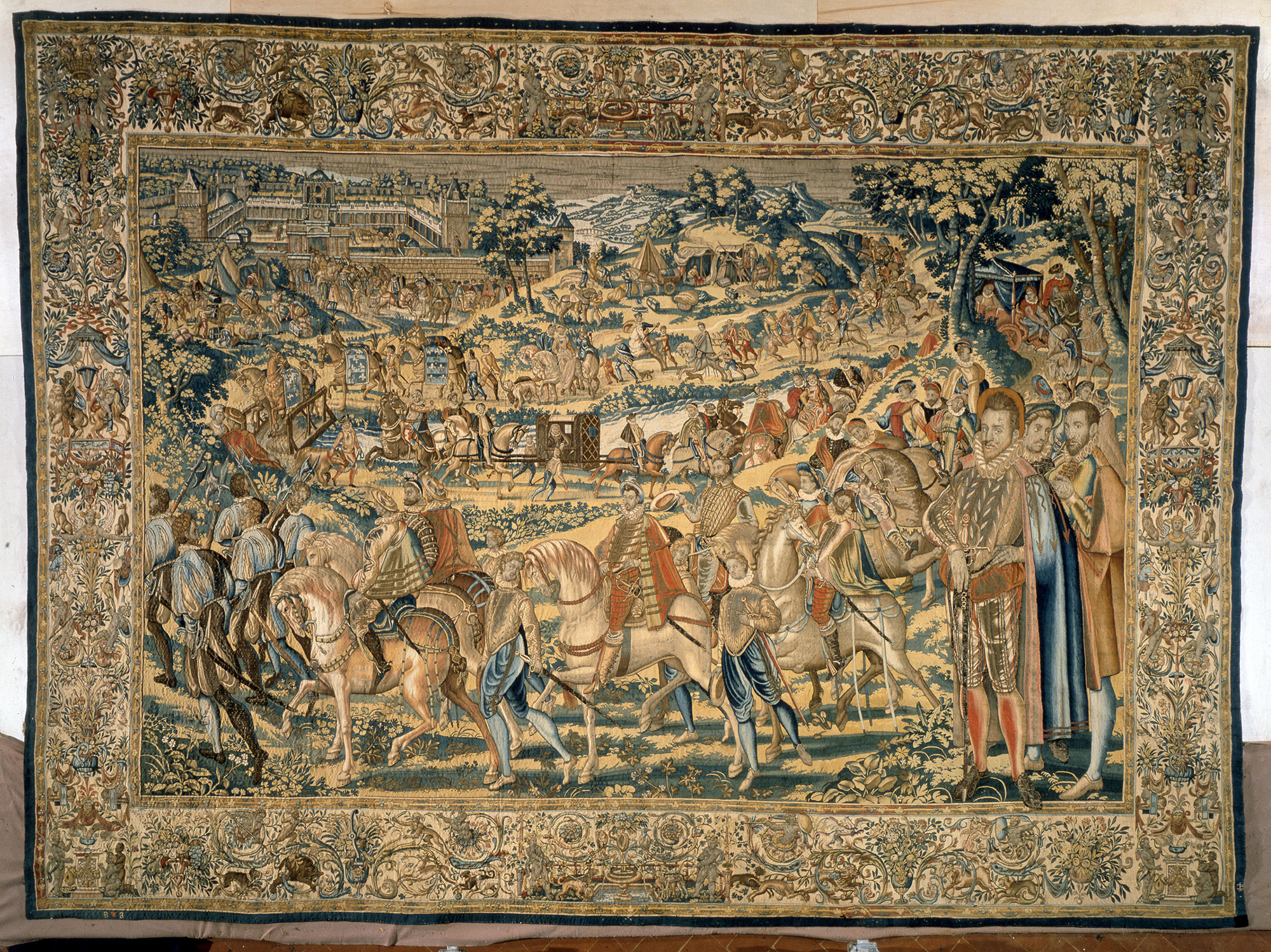
Départ de la Cour du château d'Anet, also known as Journey (390 x 534 cm.; 154 x 210 in.)

Départ de la Cour du château d'Anet, also known as Journey (390 x 534 cm.; 154 x 210 in.) depicts the royal court departing the Château d'Anet representing the departure of King Henry III for Poland in 1573. Many of the figures depicted are not identified, or so uniquely depicted that identification is very difficult. It is commonly accepted that Catherine de' Medici is depicted riding in the litter, while King Charles IX rides a horse at the head of the retinue.

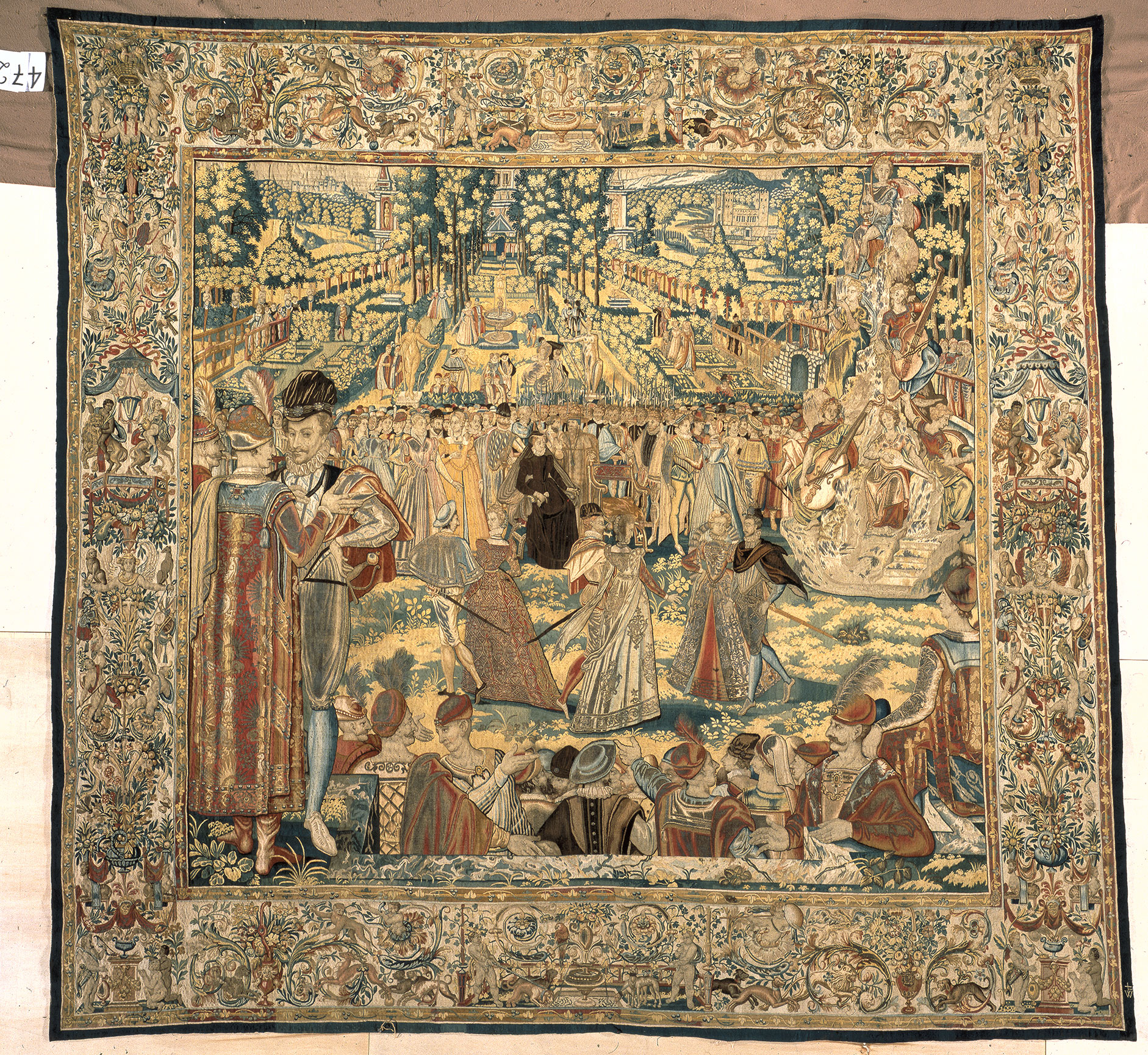
Fête aux Tuileries en l'honneur des ambassadeurs polonais, also known as Polish Ambassadors (388 x 480 cm.; 153 x 189 in.)

Fête aux Tuileries en l'honneur des ambassadeurs polonais, also known as Polish Ambassadors (388 x 480 cm.; 153 x 189 in.) depicts one of many lavish parties given at the Tuileries Palace in Paris in 1573 when a group of high-ranking Polish ambassadors came to elect Henry III to the throne of the Kingdom of Poland. Few of the figures in the tapestry are clearly identified, but a majority of scholars believe Henry I, Duke of Guise, and Anne de Joyeuse are depicted in the foreground. Catherine de' Medici is again featured centrally presiding over the festivities.

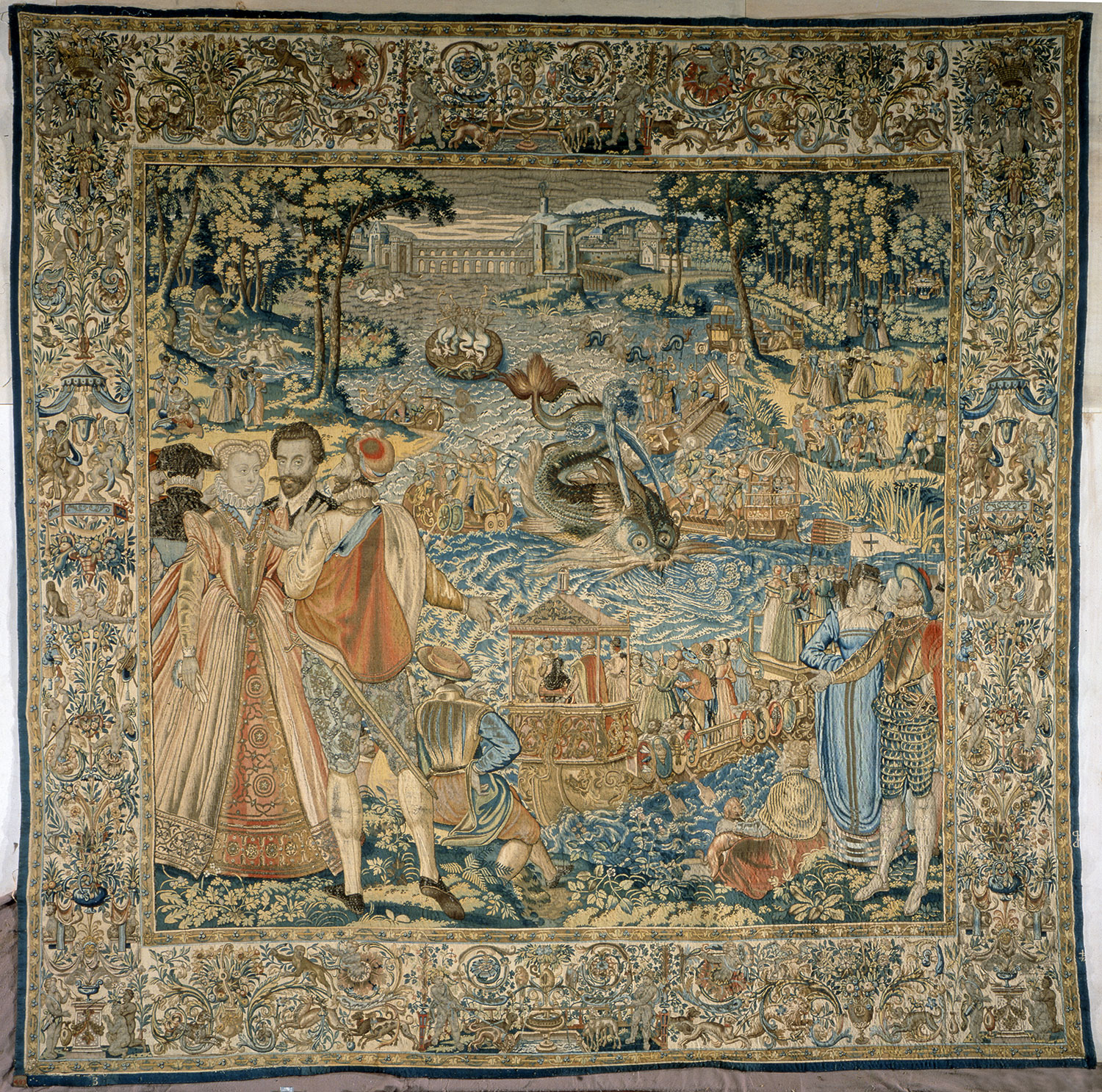
Fête nautique sur l'Adour, also known as Whale (355 x 394 cm.; 140 x 155 in.)

Fête nautique sur l'Adour, also known as Whale (355 x 394 cm.; 140 x 155 in.) depicts a banquet given in celebration of the marriage of Marguerite de Valois and Henry of Navarre, held by Catherine de' Medici on June 24, 1565, on an island on the Adour river near Bayonne. As the attendees traveled in boats to the island, music was played and an artificial whale "attacked" the boats. The god Neptune accompanies King Henry III, while tritons and sirens surround and praise Henry for defeating the whale. On the riverbanks, shepherds (a metaphor for the provinces of France) dance to the music of French horns. Catherine de' Medici, King Henry II, King Henry III, King Henry IV, Margaret of Valois, and Charles III, Duke of Lorraine are all prominently depicted.

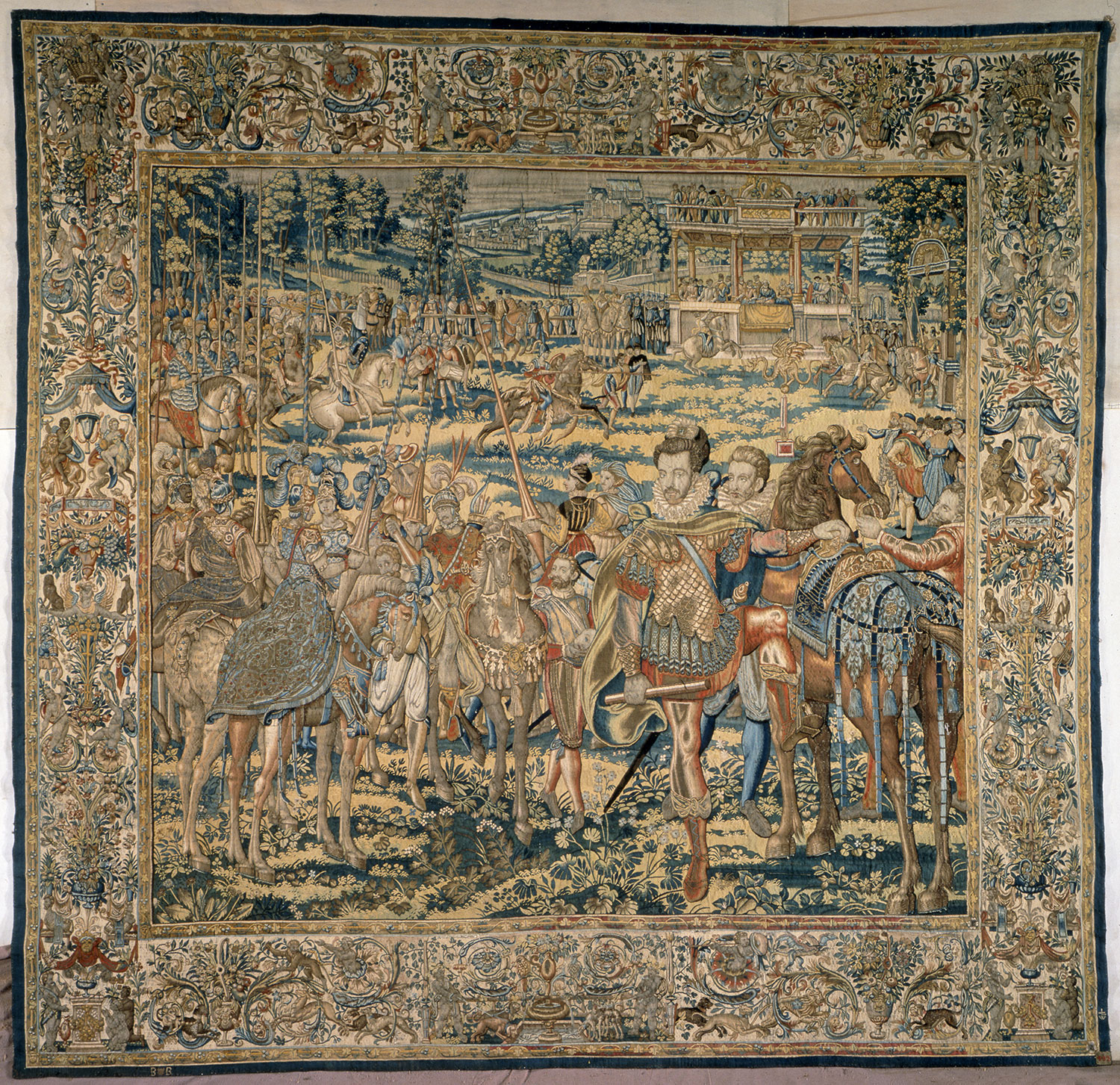
Jeu de la quintaine, also known as Quintain (387 x 400 cm.; 152 x 157 in.)

Jeu de la quintaine, also known as Quintain (387 x 400 cm.; 152 x 157 in.) depicts a game of quintain played at Bayonne on June 19, 1565 as a part of the celebrations of King Charles IX and Catherine de' Medici's return from their grand tour. The central figure in the work is Henry III.

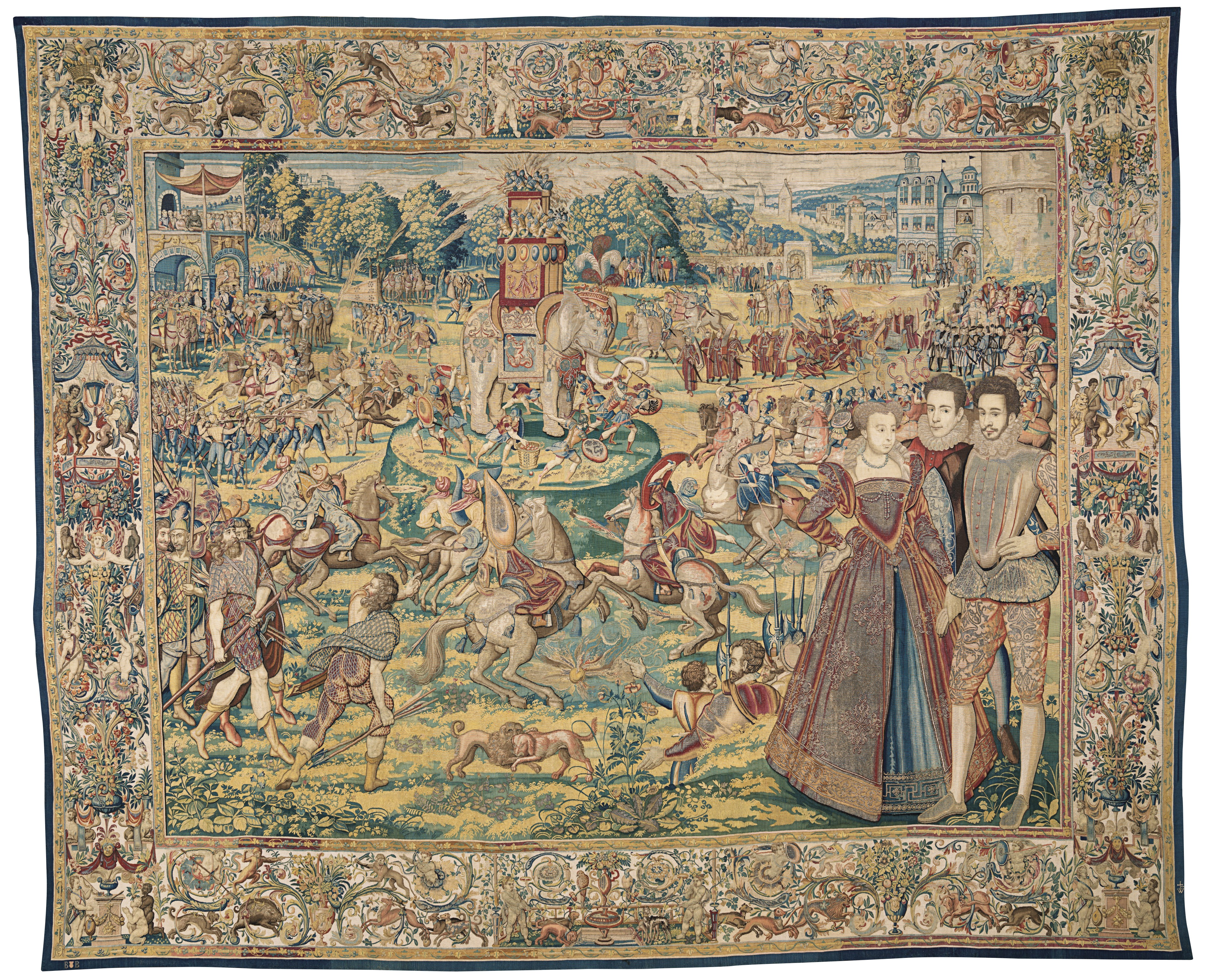
Mascarade à l'éléphant, also known as Elephant (387 x 640 cm.; 152 x 252 in.)

Mascarade à l'éléphant, also known as Elephant (387 x 640 cm.; 152 x 252 in.) depicts a partially animated artificial elephant being attacked by members of the royal family and court. The exact circumstances of the ballet de cour depicted are at best contested by historians, but a commonly held theory is that it depicts a performance in honor of Duke Francis of Anjou's entrance into Antwerp in 1582. Prominently depicted are King Henry III, Margaret of Valois, and Duke Francis.This is one of the two tapestries that does not have a corresponding original sketch by Antoine Caron.

== Provenance and preservation ==
Scholars have not firmly established who commissioned the tapestries or for whom they were intended. It is highly likely that they originally owned by, or given to Catherine de' Medici, but they are not included in the inventory of possessions drawn up after her death. It is likely that Catherine presented them to her granddaughter Christina of Lorraine, in celebration of her marriage to Ferdinando I de' Medici, Grand Duke of Tuscany, in 1589. The tapestries are now in the Uffizi Gallery in Florence, Tuscany, but are not normally on public display.

Records regarding the display of the Valois tapestries after their arrival in Florence are rare, but it is likely that the eight works were rarely displayed and never together.

All eight of the Valois tapestries were extensively conserved by the Uffizi Gallery with donation from The Friends of the Uffizi Gallery, Palm Beach, Florida in the 21st century. Fundraising for the effort began in 1998, while the conservation and restoration work took three years. The tapestries were cleaned of dust and grime, and portions of the works which were weakened by age or damaged due to pests repaired. Paint applied to the works in the 1700s and 1800s to highlight details was also removed.

In November 2018, six of the eight tapestries – Elephant, Fontainebleau, Journey, Polish Ambassadors, Tournament, and Whale – were displayed for the first time in North America at the Cleveland Museum of Art. It was also the first exhibition of the tapestries since their conservation. The works were hung in gallery with walls of various shapes and heights, similar to how they would have been hung originally. Drawings used to inspire the works and preparatory documents used by the weavers were displayed alongside the tapestries. Full-length portraits of Catherine de' Medici, Henry III of France, and Christina of Lorraine as well as a number of decorative art objects owned by the Medici family were included in the exhibit as well.

In 2023, the eight tapestries are displayed in the same room in the Musée national de la Renaissance at Écouen (France) during an exhibition dedicated to Antoine Caron.

== Conflicting scholarship ==
Yates believes that Lucas de Heere's contribution to the tapestries represented a plea to Catherine de' Medici to send the Duke of Anjou the funds he needed to confront Parma effectively. Historian R. J. Knecht questions this reading and calls the tapestries "an enigma". The reason Henry III and Catherine did not throw the full weight of France behind Anjou's campaign in the Netherlands was that they feared provoking a war with Spain. Knecht asserts that a gift of tapestries, however magnificent, would hardly have changed their minds. More recently, historians Lisa Jardine and Jerry Brotton assess the imagery of the tapestries and "turn Yates's argument on its head", concluding that "the tapestries actually are deeply antithetical to the Protestant, and specifically Huguenot, cause." They argue that the Huguenots are depicted in the tapestries not, as Yates believed, to demonstrate the tolerance of the Valois and offer a vision of different faiths and peoples at peace, but to illustrate the certain defeat of the Protestants at the hands of the Valois. They interpret the inclusion of Turks alongside the Huguenots to indicate that both were regarded as "infidels", an association previously made in the Tunis tapestries for the Habsburg Philip II's marriage to Mary I of England.

Jardine and Brotton also suggest that the Valois tapestries have a clear antecedent in the triumphalist History of Scipio tapestries designed for Francis I by Giulio Romano. Yates believed that the depiction of an elephant in one of the tapestries was based on engravings of Anjou's staged entry into Antwerp. Jardine and Brotton suggest instead that Antoine Caron based his designs for the Elephant tapestry on his own painting Night Festival with an Elephant, which in turn draws on The Battle of Zama from the Scipio tapestries. They also maintain that the political message of those tapestries remained part of the Valois ethos, since the Triumph of Scipio was displayed during the summit meeting between the French and Spanish courts at Bayonne. Knecht urges caution, however. The intent of the tapestries is to glorify the house of Valois; beyond that, he believes, all is speculation.

== See also ==
- Catherine de' Medici's patronage of the arts

== Bibliography ==
- Bertrand, Pascal-François (Fall 2006 – Winter 2007). "A New Method of Interpreting the Valois Tapestries, through a History of Catherine de Médicis". Studies in the Decorative Arts: 27–52.
- Cleland, Elizabeth A.H; Wieseman, Marjorie E; de Luca, Francesca. "Renaissance splendor: Catherine de' Medici's Valois tapestries". Cleveland, OH: Cleveland Museum of Art, 2018. ISBN 9781935294696 1935294695 9780300237061 0300237065.
- Ehrmann, Jean; Muller, René; Blunt, Anthony. "Drawings by Antoine Caron for the Valois Tapestries in the Uffizi, Florence". Detroit, MI: Detroit Institute of Arts, 1958.
- Federal Register. "Notice of Determinations; Culturally Significant Objects Imported for Exhibition-Determinations: 'Renaissance Splendor: Catherine de Medici's Valois Tapestries' Exhibition." Expanded Academic ASAP, 19 Oct. 2018. http://link.galegroup.com/apps/doc/A558794648/EAIM?u=mnacarlb&sid=EAIM&xid=d0e51151.
- Frieda, Leonie. Catherine de Medici. London: Phoenix, 2005. ISBN 0-7538-2039-0.
- Jardine, Lisa, and Jerry Brotton. Global Interests: Renaissance Art Between East And West. London: Reaktion Books, 2005. ISBN 1-86189-166-0.
- Jollet, Etienne. Jean et François Clouet. Translated by Deke Dusinberre. Paris: Lagune, 1997. ISBN 0-500-97465-9.
- Knecht, R. J. Catherine de' Medici. London and New York: Longman, 1998. ISBN 0-582-08241-2.
- Kociszewska, Ewa. "Woven Bloodlines: The Valois Tapestries in the Trousseau of Christine de Lorraine, Grand Duchess of Tuscany". Artibus et Historiae 73, (2016): 335-363. ISSN 0391-9064.
- Sayce, R. A. Review of, "The Valois Tapestries" by Frances A. Yates. The Modern Language Review, Vol. 55 No. 4 (Oct. 1960). 601-602.
- Strong, Roy. Splendor at Court: Renaissance Spectacle and the Theater of Power. Boston: Houghton Mifflin, 1973. ISBN 0-395-17220-9.
- Sutherland, Nicola Mary (1966). Catherine de Medici and the Ancien Régime. London: Historical Association.
- Walker, D.P. Review of, "The Valois Tapestries" by Frances A. Yates. Comparative Literature, Vol.12 No. 2 (Spring 1960). 178-180.
- Yates, Frances. The Valois Tapestries. London: Routledge & Kegan Paul, 1959; 2nd ed. 1975, reprinted 1999. ISBN 0-415-22043-2.
