= Giordano Bruno and the Hermetic Tradition =

1964 book by Frances A. Yates

- Front cover art for Giordano Bruno and the Hermetic Tradition
- Author: Frances A. Yates
- Language: English
- Publisher: University of Chicago Press
- Publication date: 1964
- Publication place: United Kingdom
- Media type: Print (book)
- Pages: 466
- ISBN: 0-226-95007-7
- OCLC: 23685519
- Followed by: The Art of Memory

Giordano Bruno and the Hermetic Tradition is a 1964 non-fiction book by British historian Frances A. Yates. The book delves into the history of Hermeticism and its influence upon Renaissance philosophy and Giordano Bruno.

With the publication of Giordano Bruno and the Hermetic Tradition, Yates transformed Renaissance historiography. In it, she revealed the hermeticism with which the Renaissance was imbued, and the revived interest in mysticism, magic and Gnosticism of Late Antiquity that survived the Middle Ages. In the face of longstanding conventional interpretations, Yates suggested that the itinerant Catholic priest Giordano Bruno was burned at the stake in 1600 for espousing the Hermetic tradition rather than his affirmation of heliocentricity.

== Reception ==
=== Reviews contemporary to publication ===
An article in the American Historical Review appearing shortly after the book was released essentially proclaims that Yates has redefined both her subject and changed the whole complexion of historical understanding about how the early scientific enlightenment unfolded.

A review in Commentary mentions Yates as one among a handful of authors by whose work, “we begin to understand the reasons underlying the interest in Kabbalah expressed by Italian humanists and Renaissance philosophers.”

These works,”represented an effort to go beyond the provincialism of western Christianity, an effort which revealed a profound dissatisfaction with medieval theology and the medieval conception of man and the universe, and a longing for a universalistic, transhistorical, ‘mystical’ religion... This [transformation in scholarly understanding] is evident in the works of Pico della Mirandola, Giordano Bruno, Campanella, and other humanists and philosophers discussed by Frances Yates in her masterful book Giordano Bruno and the Hermetic Tradition.” The monograph on Bruno by Yates receives special attention whereas the others (apart from Gershom Scholem, to whom the feature is actually devoted) are passed over without mention. Yates, in nuce, stands out from the rest of the field in hermetic studies; while Scholem is the representative scholar in the terrain of Kabbalah.

Yates receives recognition as a more sober student in her own hermetic terrain then Aleister Crowley, A.E. Waite, or Eliphas Levi from Scholem himself in a lecture on the possibility of mysticism in our time, delivered at a synagogue in the precincts of the Temple Mount in Jerusalem shortly before the Bruno book’s actual publication.

The Bruno book’s legacy has been enduring. Alan Charles Kors and Edward Peters, the editors of a sourcebook of historical primary documents in the history of witchcraft remark that,”the classic work Giordano Bruno & the Hermetic Tradition remains among the best of its kind on the subject.”

=== Broader significance ===
Roughly speaking, Frances Yates may be understood as a kind of third force or mediating voice between at least two other major seminal scholars of the period in which it is written (Gershom Scholem and Thomas Kuhn) whose publications constitute the genesis of a new academic discipline: History and Philosophy of Science.

Furthermore—this should be underlined—Giordano Bruno & The Hermetic Tradition is the work that introduces Yates into this constellation as a major and seminal voice. Her work on the Art of Memory has a long after-life for other reasons, including the vogue for constructing Memory Palaces that enjoyed popular attention in the second decade of the 21st century. But it was her Bruno study that helped to catalyze the invention of a whole new department at a substantive plurality of major western universities.

The Yates study on Bruno, Kuhn's Structure of Scientific Revolutions, and Scholem's Origins of the Kabbalah all appear in print almost simultaneously. Scholem had reintroduced the tradition of Kabbalah as a serious, and rich source of historical insight worthy of scholarly attention over the course of his career—not least in terms of its overlap with alchemy, which Scholem begins to investigate at the beginning of his prolific body of work and to which he devotes the final topical monograph that he wrote prior to his death. His work on the Origins is less well known then several of Scholem's other major books but it represents the academic synthesis of evidence on how Kabbalah arose as a phenomenon intertwined with Christian heresy (and ultimately with marginal heterodox pursuits such as Alchemy, fortune-telling etc.) that he'd been searching for and compiling since the early 1920's when he published his translation of the threshold text in medieval kabbalah Das Buch Bahir. Meanwhile, Kuhn's book examines the ways in which paradigm shifts in science don't necessarily arise according to rational processes or follow rational patterns—e.g. Isaac Newton was as much an alchemist as he was a man of the scientific enlightenment etc.

Precursors

The influence of the Warburg Library as an institutional force had a great deal of impact in arriving at this moment in intellectual history—but as the journal editor for the Warburg Institute during its decisive early period the phenomena of that body's institutional success should be partly attributed to Frances Yates.

D.P. Walker’s Spiritual & Demonic Magic is an important precursor text before the Bruno study but we must again note that as the resident editor of the Warburg Institute she had a hand both curating and creating that book.

Prior to the founding of the Warburg Library, Lynn Thorndike's voluminous and prolific work on the influence of alchemy in the early stages of the scientific revolution (and as an exhaustive bibliographer and archivist cataloging the hermetic tradition of alchemical texts) deserves mention as precursor model or scholarly anticipation of Scholem's lifelong work on the Kabbalah and as an archive consulted by Yates. Before Thorndike, Henry Charles Lea (re: Materials Toward a History of Witchcraft), Jane Ellen Harrison (Themis, Prolegomena to the Study of Greek Religion) of the Cambridge Ritualists, and the ethnographic work of James Frazer in The Golden Bough should likewise be mentioned as even older source-texts and compilations of primaries.

Likewise, Adorno's Dialectic of the Enlightenment opens lines of questioning further explored in Kuhn's SOSR about the pathologies and unintended consequences of the scientific Enlightenment (one might say that where Adorno looks at impacts and outcomes of the Enlightenment as an ideology, Kuhn looks at the idiosyncrasies of its origins). As a consulting correspondent and inspirational colleague to Scholem who was also a mentor figure to Adorno from whose unpublished (in 1944) work much of the Dialectic is cribbed, a subtle gravitational backdrop of Walter Benjamin’s rhetorical influence over this whole discourse is incalculable due to its esoteric diffusion throughout the early conversation but clearly immense in its ramifications.

Critical mass of academic influence

Yet it was the appearance of the works by Yates, Scholem and Kuhn at the same time in the early sixties that marks a threshold after which the History and Philosophy of Science begins to coalesce as a discipline. Kuhn’s theoretical work is more forward facing as a theoretical text that bleeds into popular culture as a new jargon (re:'paradigm shifts'), while the Yates study of Bruno is an exemplary historical case-study in the emerging discipline (which remained unnamed and only begins to really stabilize as a departmental presence closer to the end of the century).

The book that Yates publishes on Giordano Bruno bridges the gap between Kuhn's high-level and popular insights about scientific paradigm shifts with the depth of research done by scholars like Scholem (whom Yates reviewed). Giordano Bruno & The Hermetic Tradition represents a fulcrum point between seriously academic scholarship devoted to the occult, and new philosophical lines of thought concerned with evolution of sciences and technology—behind which the apparition of the atomic warfare in the contemporary backdrop (re: all of this work comes out in the immediate aftermath of the Cuban Missile Crisis) provided the urgency necessary for the field to open up.

== In popular culture ==
The book is cited by British writer Philip Pullman as a central inspiration for his own writing.

== See also ==
- Renaissance humanism
- Renaissance magic
