= Lucas de Heere =

Flemish painter

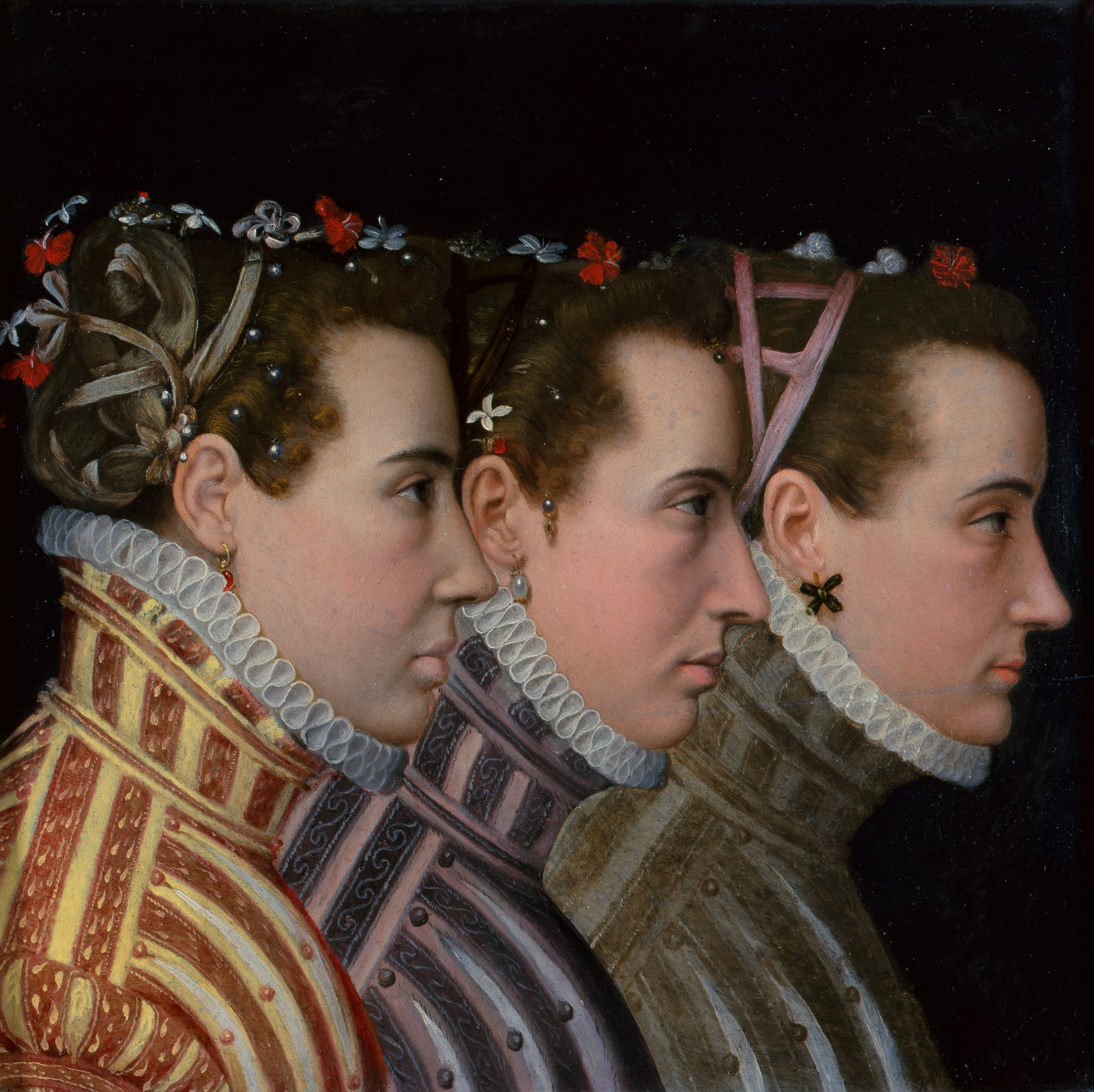
Triple profile portrait attributed to Lucas de Heere

Lucas de Heere or Lucas d'Heere (Ghent, 1534 – possibly Paris, 29 August 1584) was a Flemish painter, watercolorist, print artist, biographer, playwright, poet and writer. His costume books and portraits are a valuable resource for knowledge about 16th-century fashion.

== Life ==
The principal source for the life and work of de Heere is Het Schilder-Boeck written by his pupil Karel van Mander first published in 1604 in Haarlem in the Dutch Republic, where van Mander resided in the latter part of his life. Lucas de Heere was born in Ghent, the second son of Jan de Heere, a sculptor, and Anna Smijters, a miniaturist. He was trained by his father. His brother Jan was apprenticed as a painter's apprentice to the local artist Gerard Hoorenbault. He also had four sisters.

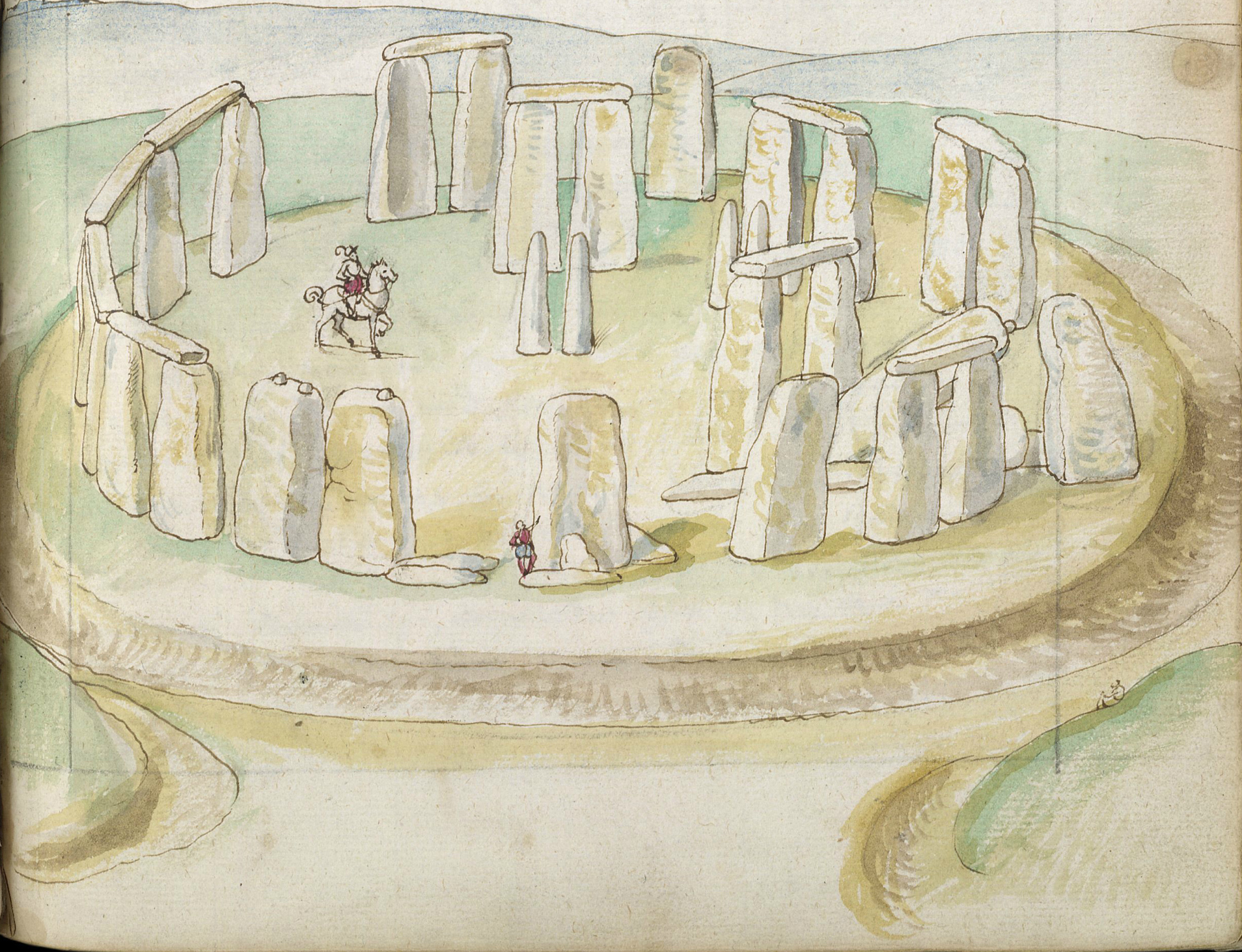
The earliest-known realistic painting of Stonehenge (1573–1575)

After the citizens of Ghent revolted against their ruler emperor Charles V, the city's privileges were abolished by the Carolinian Concession in 1540. As a result, the power of the guilds was broken and artistic activity came to a standstill. Against this background, Jan de Heere sent his son Lucas to Antwerp to study under the leading Flemish painter and draughtsman of his time, Frans Floris. This was likely also the time when he started composing poetry. Upon his return to Ghent likely around 1556, he established a school of painting. One of his students was Karel van Mander. In 1559, he and his father were commissioned by the Ghent magistrate with the decoration of St John's Church – now St Bavo's Cathedral, Ghent – on the occasion of the reunion of the 23rd Chapter of the Golden Fleece. Lucas completed for this commission the painting King Solomon and the Queen of Sheba in which Solomon is given the features of king Philip II of Spain. Around 1560, he married Eleonore Carboniers.

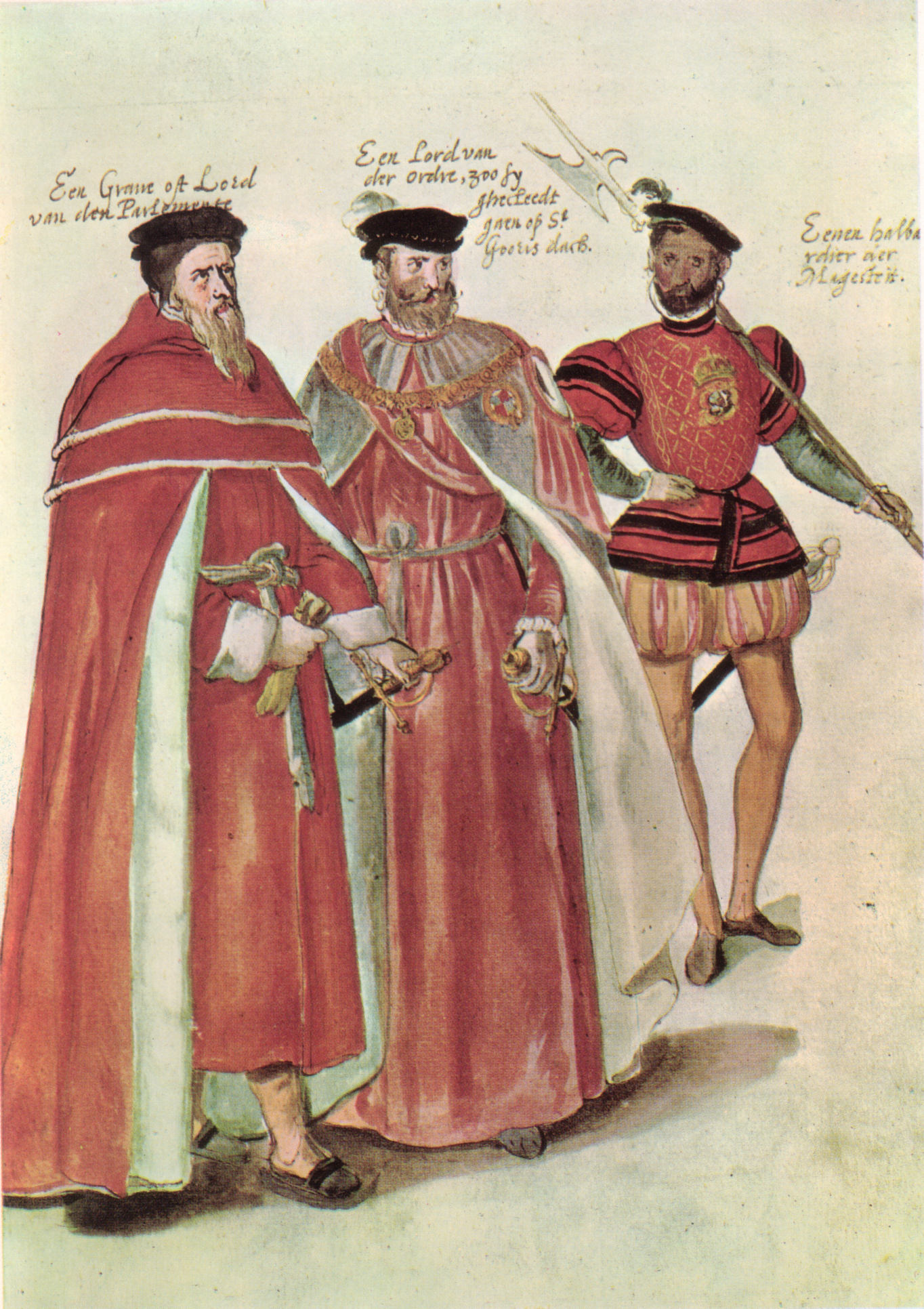
Two English peers, one in Parliamentary robes and one in the robes of the Order of the Garter with a halberdier in the livery of Elizabeth I, 1567.

After the Spanish Netherlands revolted against Philip II of Spain in 1568 because of his suppression of the followers of the Reformation movement, De Heere went to France, where he was reportedly employed by Catherine de' Medici to assist in the design of the Valois Tapestries. He then traveled to England, where he became an elder of the Dutch stranger church at Austin Friars. In 1570, he was employed by Edward Clinton, 1st Earl of Lincoln to paint a gallery and depict the clothing and costumes of various nations. After the Pacification of Ghent in 1576, he was able to return home, if only for a while. He was once again forced to leave the city in 1584, when Ghent surrendered to Spanish Habsburg forces.

He was very popular during his career and became immensely rich. His portrait of Katheryn of Berain is held by the National Museum Cardiff. He painted a head of Philip II from the life in 1553, as a letter of Cardinal Granvelle documents (Prado).

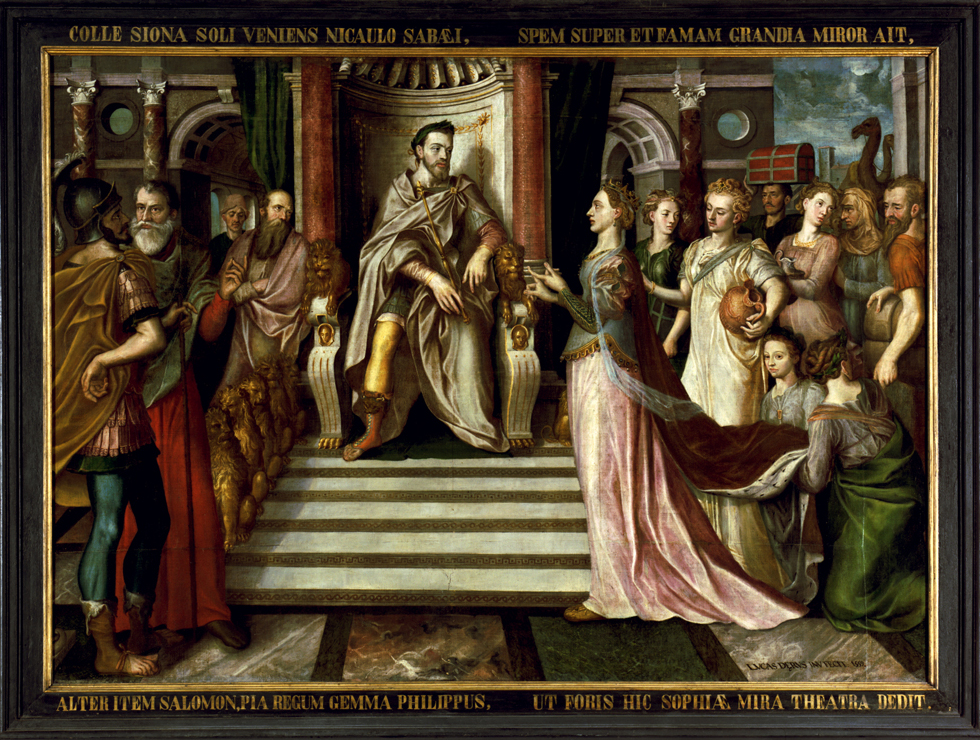
The Queen of Sheba visits King Solomon

In 1559 he painted by order of the chancellor Viglius van Aytta Solomon and the Queen of Sheba, which was commissioned for the choir of St Bavo's Cathedral in Ghent before the celebration of the twenty-third chapter of the Order of the Golden Fleece, conserved in situ.

In England he trained other Flemish immigrants: John de Critz, probably Marcus Gheeraerts the Younger, and possibly as well the English Robert Peake the Elder.

Some time between 1573 and 1575 he visited Stonehenge. His watercolor sketch (now in the British Library) is the earliest known realistic depiction of the site.

== Publications ==
While he was in exile, de Heere developed an interest in ethnography, history and geography. This translated in his illustrated works such as Corte beschryvinghe van Engheland Schotland ende Irland (a description of England, Scotland and Ireland), the Corte beschryvinghe van D'engelandsche geschiedenissen (a description of the English history) and the Theatre de tous les peuples et nations de la terre (a manuscript displaying the different costumes people wore). The latter book is a very rare manuscript. It holds a special value for the collective memory because it displays the perception of historical and contemporary costumes of the 16th century. The manuscript has 98 paintings of Lucas de Heere and is preserved in the Ghent University Library.

== Other publications ==
- Beschrijvinghe van het ghene dat vertoocht wierdt ter incomste van dExcellentie des princen van Orangien binnen der stede van Ghendt [...], S.l.: s.n., 1578. Google Books
- Pasquillus testament, ten zijn fablen noch droomen, deur den paus toegelaten ende ghedruct in Roomen, aen u Nederlants volck, ghesonden voor memorie, u over de Spaengiaerts wenschende eewige victorie, S.l.: s.n., 1579. Google Books
- Den hof ende boomgaert der poësien, Haarlem: David Wachtendonck, 1614. Google Books.

== Gallery ==
Selected works

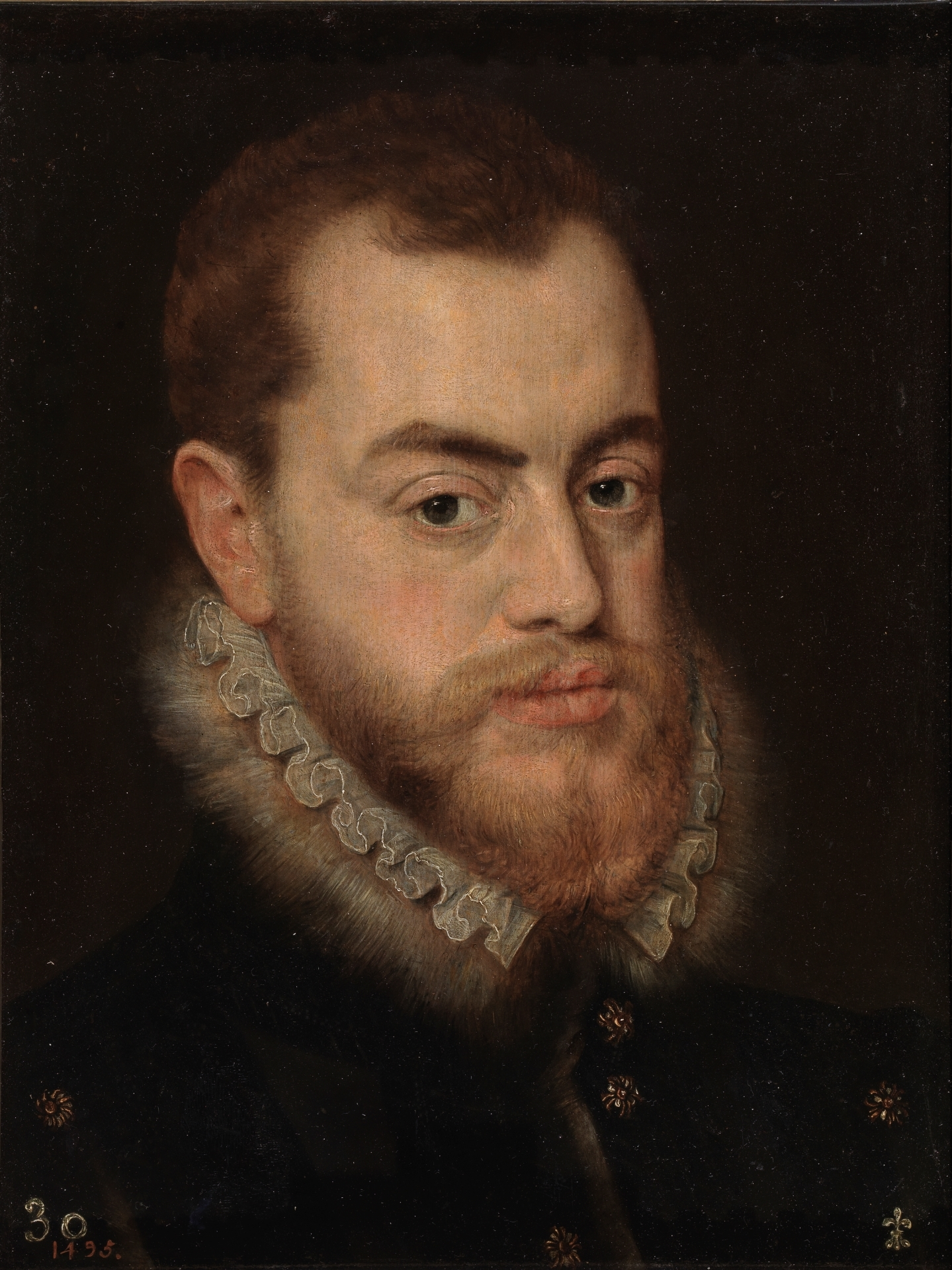
Portrait of Philip II

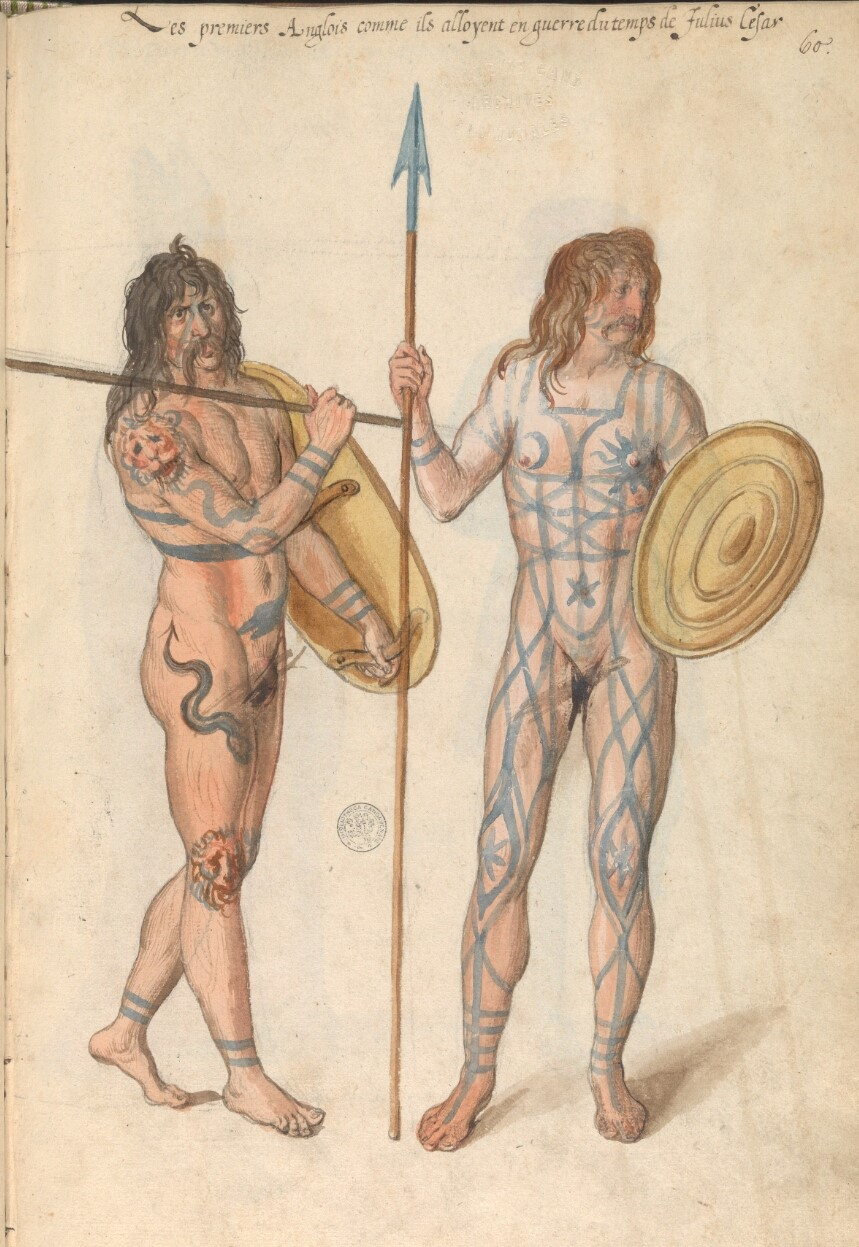
From the Theatre de tous les peuples et nations de la terre.

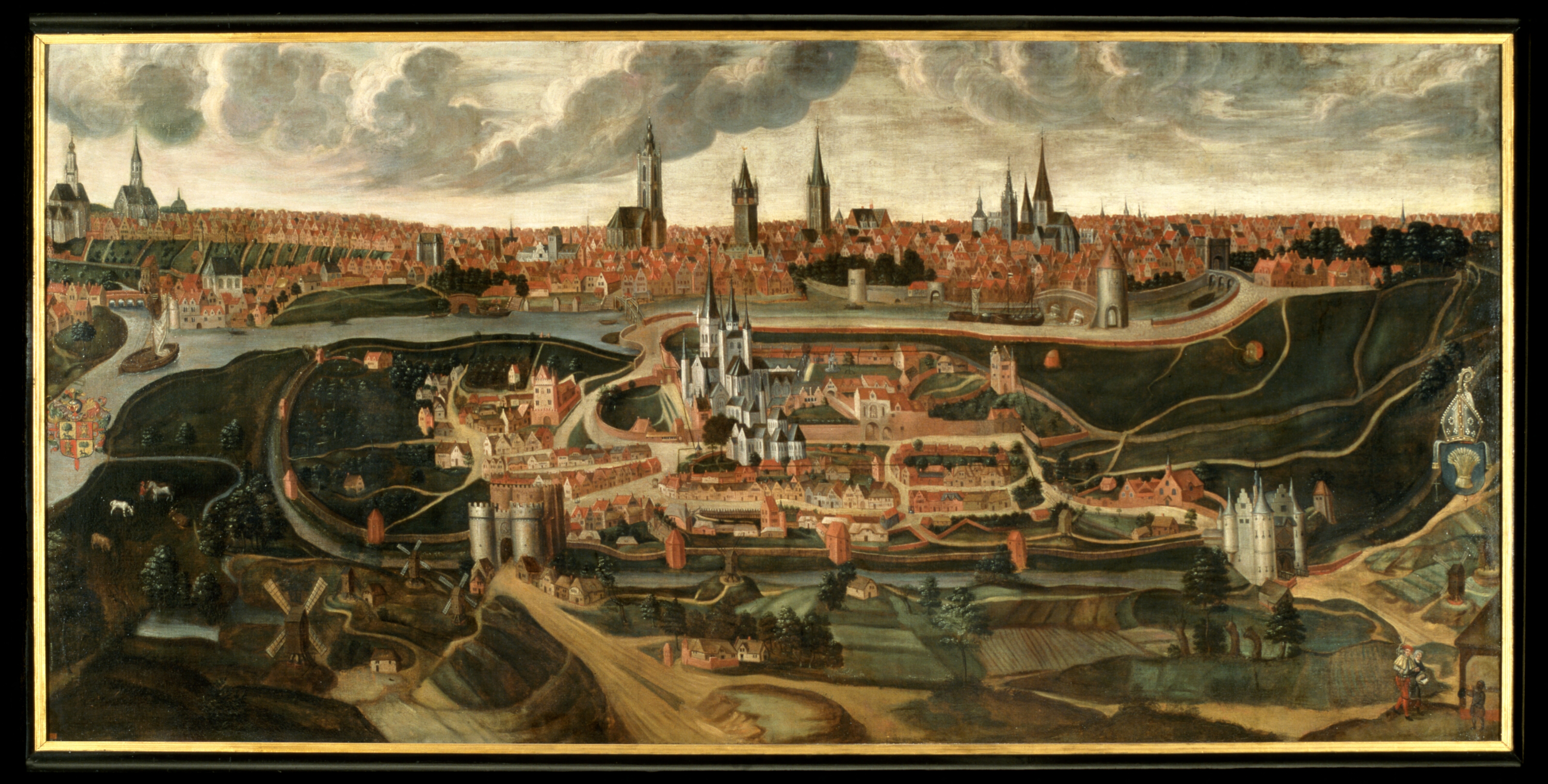
View of the city of Ghent in 1540.
