= Frances Yates =

English historian of the Renaissance (1899–1981)

Dame Frances Yates DBE FBA
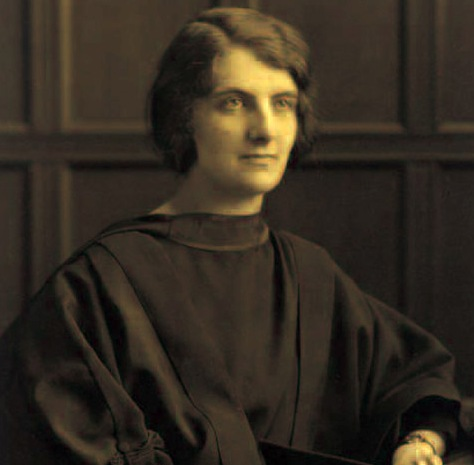
- Yates in graduation robes, 1924
- Born: Frances Amilia Yeats; 28 November 1899; Southsea, England
- Died: 29 September 1981 (aged 81); Surbiton, England
- Education: University College London, Warburg Institute
- Occupations: Historian; writer
- Writing career
- Subject: History of Western esotericism

Dame Frances Amelia Yates DBE FBA (28 November 1899 – 29 September 1981) was an English historian of the Renaissance who wrote on the history of esotericism.

After attaining an MA in French at University College London, she began to publish her research in scholarly journals and academic books, focusing on 16th-century theatre and the life of the linguist and lexicographer John Florio. In 1941, she was employed by the Warburg Institute in London, and began to work on what she termed "Warburgian history", emphasising a pan-European and inter-disciplinary approach to historiography.

Her most acclaimed publication was Giordano Bruno and the Hermetic Tradition (1964), in which she emphasised the role of Hermeticism in Bruno's works and the role that magic and mysticism played in Renaissance thinking. The Art of Memory (1966), and The Rosicrucian Enlightenment (1972) are also major works. Yates wrote extensively on the occult or Neoplatonic philosophies of the Renaissance, which she is credited with making more accessible.

== Biography ==
=== Youth: 1899–1913 ===
It seems to me now the Golden Age, in which the security and stability of the Victorian era were still intact and seemed the natural state of affairs, which would continue for ever (though in a less severe and easier form). It was not, of course, a golden age for all, but for me it was a time of perfect safety and happiness when I first put down roots of experience and inquiry in a world which made sense.

— Frances Yates, on her childhood

Frances Amelia Yates was born on 28 November 1899 in the southern English coastal town of Southsea. She was the fourth child of middle-class parents, James Alfred and Hannah Malpas Yates, and had two sisters, Ruby and Hannah, and a brother, Jimmy. James was the son of a Royal Navy gunner, and occupied a senior position, overseeing the construction of dreadnoughts. He was a keen reader, ensuring that his children had access to plenty of books. James was a devout Anglican Christian, influenced by the Oxford Movement and sympathetic to the Catholic Church. Frances was christened in February 1900 at St. Anne's Church in the dockyard, although from an early age had doubts about Christianity and the literal accuracy of the Bible.

In 1902, James was transferred to Chatham Dockyards, and then in December 1903 he relocated to Glasgow to become superintendent of shipbuilding on the River Clyde. There, the family began attending the Scottish Episcopal Church of St. Mary. James retired in 1911, although continued to offer his advice and expertise to the dockyards. The family moved regularly over the coming years, from a farmhouse in Ingleton, Yorkshire, to Llandrindod Wells, to Ripon, to Harrogate, and then to Oxton in Cheshire. They also took annual holidays to France each summer.

Throughout this period, Yates's education was haphazard. In her early years, she was home schooled, being taught to read by her sisters before her mother took over her education as they moved away from home. When in Glasgow she briefly attended the private Laurel Bank School, but wouldn't attend school for two years after leaving the city. Despite a lack of formal education, she read avidly, impressed by the plays of William Shakespeare, and the poetry of the Romantics and Pre-Raphaelites, in particular that of Dante Gabriel Rossetti and John Keats. She also began to write; in March 1913, Yates published a short story in the Glasgow Weekly Herald. Aged 16 she began writing a diary, in which she stated that "my brother wrote poems, my sister writes novels, my other sister paints pictures and I, I must & will do something. I am not much good at painting, I am no good at all at music, so there is only writing left. So I will write."

=== Early career: 1914–38 ===
In 1914, the First World War broke out; her brother joined the British Army, and was killed in battle in 1915. As a result, she said that the "war broke our family... As a teenager I lived among the ruins." Deciding to pursue a university education, she unsuccessfully sat the University of Oxford entrance exam, hoping to study history. The family subsequently moved to Claygate, Surrey, settling into a newly built house in which Yates lived until her death. Her sisters had moved away, leaving Frances to care for her ageing parents, although she also regularly took the train to central London, where she spent much time reading and researching in the library of the British Museum.

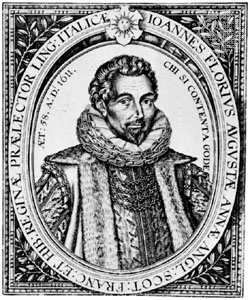
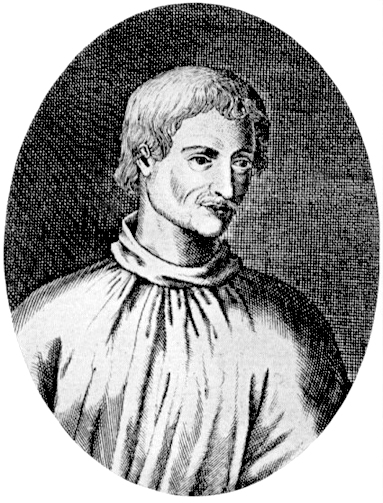
Yates's research focused on two Renaissance figures, John Florio (left) and Giordano Bruno (right).

In the early 1920s she began her undergraduate studies in French at the University College, London. Enrolled as an external student, she devoted herself to her studies, and did not socialise with other students. She was awarded her BA with first-class honours in May 1924. She published her first scholarly article in 1925, on "English Actors in Paris during the Lifetime of Shakespeare", which appeared in the inaugural issue of The Review of English Studies. She then started an MA in French at the University of London, this time as an internal student. Her thesis was titled "Contribution to the Study of the French Social Drama in the Sixteenth Century", and in it she argued that the plays of this period could be seen as propaganda aimed at the illiterate population. Although written for a degree in French, it was heavily historical, and showed Yates's interest in challenging prior assumptions and interpretations of the past. Supervised by Louis M. Brandin and F. Y. Eccles, she was awarded her MA on the basis of it in 1926. From 1929 to 1934, Yates taught French at the North London Collegiate School, but disliked it as it left little time for her to devote to her research.

While looking at records in the London Public Record Office, she learned of John Florio in a 1585 testimonial. Intrigued by him, she devoted her third scholarly paper to the subject of Florio: "John Florio at the French Embassy", which appeared in The Modern Language Review in 1929. She proceeded to author a biography of Florio, John Florio: The Life of an Italian in Shakespeare's England, which Cambridge University Press published in 1934; they agreed to the publication on the condition that it be shortened and that Yates contributed £100 to its publication. The book gained positive reviews and earned Yates the British Academy's Mary Crawshaw Prize. Having previously relied on self-taught Italian, in summer 1935 she spent several weeks at a course in the language held for scholars at Girton College, University of Cambridge; here she developed lifelong friendships with Nesca Robb and Linetta de Castelvecchio, both fellow scholars of the Renaissance. Yates's second book was A Study of Love's Labour's Lost, an examination of Love's Labour's Lost. It was published by Cambridge University Press in 1936.

Through her research into Florio, Yates had become intrigued by one of his associates, Giordano Bruno. She translated Bruno's La Cena de la ceneri (The Ash Wednesday Supper), and added an introduction in which she argued against the prevailing view that Bruno had simply been a proponent of Copernicus' Heliocentric theories; instead she argued that he was calling for a return to Medieval Catholicism. She offered the book to Cambridge University Press, who declined to publish it; she later commented that it was "the worst of my efforts ... it was lamentably ignorant of Renaissance thought and Renaissance magic." In reassessing Bruno's thought, Yates had been influenced by a number of other scholars who had begun to recognise the role of magic and mysticism in Renaissance thought: French historian of science Pierre Duhem, American historian Lynn Thorndike, and Renaissance studies scholar Francis Johnson. Yates's biographer Marjorie Jones suggested that this interpretation was partly influenced by her own religious views, which – influenced by the Romanticists and Pre-Raphaelites – adored Catholic ritual and were critical of the Protestant Reformation.

=== Joining the Warburg Institute: 1939–60 ===
One of Yates's friends, the historian and fellow Bruno scholar Dorothea Singer, introduced her to Edgar Wind, Deputy Directory of the Warburg Institute, at a weekend house party in Par, Cornwall. At Wind's invitation, Yates contributed a paper on "Giordano Bruno's Conflict with Oxford" for the second issue of the Journal of the Warburg Institute in 1939, which she followed with "The Religious Policy of Giordano Bruno" in the third issue. In these articles, she did not yet associate Bruno with Hermeticism. In 1941, the Warburg's Director Fritz Saxl offered Yates a job at the institute, then based in South Kensington; she agreed, taking on the post which revolved largely on editing the Journal but which also gave her much time to continue her independent research. By this time, Britain had entered the Second World War against Nazi Germany, and Yates involved herself in the war effort, being trained in first aid by the Red Cross and volunteered as an ARP ambulance attendant. In 1941, her father died during an air raid, although the cause of death is not known. Yates herself continued to have depression, and was deeply unhappy.

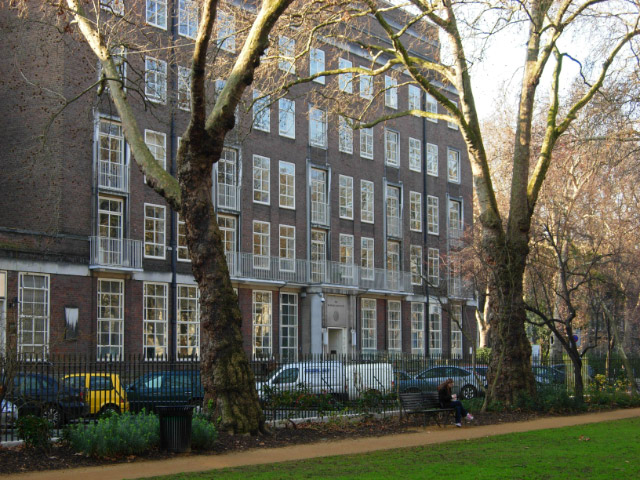
The Warburg Institute in Woburn Square, London

In 1943, Yates was awarded the British Federation of University Women's Marion Reilly Award. She also gave an address to the Federation's Committee on International Relations on "How will History be written if the Germans win this war?" At the Warburg, her intellectual circle included Anthony Blunt, Margaret Whinney, Franz Boaz, Ernst Gombrich, Gertrud Bing, Charles and Dorothea Singer, D. P. Walker, Fritz Saxl, Eugénie Droz, and Roy Strong. At this time, she also developed lifelong friendships with Jan van Dorsten and Rosemond Tuve, both scholars.

Upon Britain's victory in the war, Yates was among a number of Warburg scholars who emphasised the need for pan-European historiography, so as to reject the nationalisms that had led to the World Wars; this approach, she believed, must be both international and interdisciplinary. She described this new approach as "Warburgian history", defining this as the "history of culture as a whole – the history of thought, science, art, including the history of imagery and symbolism." Connected to this, she believed that school education should focus on pan-European, rather than simply British history.

The Warburg Institute published Yates's third book in 1947 as The French Academies of the Sixteenth Century. She described this as "an ambitious effort to apply the Warburgian modes of work, to use art, music philosophy, religion" to elucidate the subject. The following year, she began to contemplate writing a book on Bruno, and spent September 1951 in Italy, visiting places that had been associated with his life. By 1948, both Yates sisters had moved back to the family home in Claygate; however, in March 1951 Hannah died of leukemia, and Yates's mother died in October 1952. Despite the problems in her personal life, she continued her scholarship, typically publishing two or three scholarly papers a year. She also lectured on the subjects of her research at various different universities across Britain; during the 1950s she lectured on the subject of espérance impériale, which would later be collected and published as Astraea: The Imperial Theme in the Sixteenth Century (1975).

In 1954, Gertrud Bing became Director of the Warburg, overseeing the move from South Kensington to a specially-constructed building in Woburn Square, Bloomsbury. Bing was a close friend of Yates, and they often went on holidays together. Yates's fourth book, published in 1959, was The Valois Tapestries, in which she discussed the eponymous tapestries in the Uffizi in Florence, Italy. She offered a novel interpretation of the tapestries, approaching them as if they were "a detective story" and arguing that they were meant as portraits of the French royal family.

=== International acclaim: 1961–81 ===
Yates's scholarly productivity increased in the 1960s and 1970s, when she also became a regular book reviewer for The New York Review of Books. In 1961, Yates authored Giordano Bruno and the Hermetic Tradition, which has come to be widely regarded as her masterpiece. In her diary, she wrote that she now "saw Hermeticism as the clue to Bruno and the whole view of Renaissance magic in relation to him." She had been encouraged to adopt this view by her friend, D.P. Walker. The book was published in 1964 by Cambridge University Press. The work brought her international scholarly fame, and in 1965 she went on a lecture tour of the United States. Her next publication was a part-sequel to Giordano Bruno and the Hermetic Tradition, being published as The Art of Memory in 1966. In 1967, she was elected a Fellow of the British Academy (FBA). In 1969 she published Theatre of the World. Her next book, published by Routledge in 1972, was The Rosicrucian Enlightenment, in which she looked at the influence of the Rosicrucian manifestos in 16th century Europe.

In 1971, Yates was awarded an honorary doctorate from the University of East Anglia, which was presented to her by Angus Wilson, and in the New Year Honours 1972 Yates was appointed an Officer of the Order of the British Empire for services to Art History. In October 1973, she was awarded a £5000 Wolfson Award for her wider oeuvre, and in January 1974, Yates delivered four Northcliffe lectures at University College London (UCL). They would subsequently be published by Routledge in 1975 as Shakespeare's Last Plays: A New Approach. She was elected a Foreign Honorary Member of the American Academy of Arts and Sciences in 1975. That same year also saw the publication of Astraea: The Imperial Theme in the Sixteenth Century, which collected together lectures that she had presented in the 1950s. In February 1976, Smith College in Northampton, Massachusetts offered Yates the Kennedy Professorship, which she declined.

Yates was promoted in the Queen's Birthday Honours 1977 to Dame Commander of the Order of the British Empire (DBE) for services to Renaissance studies. In 1978, the University of Pisa awarded her the Premio Galileo Galilei for her contribution to the study of Italian history. In March 1979, the British Academy awarded her a £2000 grant so that she could continue to travel from her home to London in order to conduct research.

In 1974, an academic conference was held at UCLA's Clark Library in Los Angeles, California, that debated and discussed what was termed the "Yates thesis". The last decade of her life saw her critics become both more numerous and more outspoken; however, she gained a champion in the form of historian Hugh Trevor-Roper, who positively reviewed her works and became a personal friend. In 1979, Yates published The Occult Philosophy in the Elizabethan Age, in which she discussed the place of the Christian Cabala during the Renaissance and its influence on Christian Neoplatonism. It did not prove as successful as her books published in the 1960s.

It was during the early 1970s that she began writing an autobiography, inspired by E. M. Forster's biography of Goldsworthy Lowes Dickinson; it was left unfinished on her death, although portions were published posthumously. In March 1979, Yates's sister Ruby moved into a nursing home, before Yates went on a lecture tour of the U.S. Ruby died in May 1980, leaving Yates as the last surviving member of her immediate family. In 1980 Yates was elected a foreign member of the Royal Netherlands Academy of Arts and Sciences. In summer 1981, Yates went on a lecture tour of Hungary, coming to believe that Anglophone scholarship had neglected Central Europe. Her final lecture was delivered at Manchester Cathedral, and was on the subject of John Dee, whom Yates was taking an increasing research interest in. Shortly after, she fell over at home, and was hospitalised with a cracked femur. She recovered and returned home, where she died in her sleep. Her body was cremated in an Anglican memorial service.

== Scholarly writings ==
With the publication of Giordano Bruno and the Hermetic Tradition Yates highlighted the hermeticism within Renaissance culture, and spoke of the interest in mysticism, magic and Gnosticism of Late Antiquity that survived the Middle Ages. Yates suggested that the itinerant Catholic priest Giordano Bruno was executed in 1600 for espousing the Hermetic tradition rather than his affirmation of cosmic eccentricity. Her works drew attention to the role played by magic in early modern science and philosophy, before scholars such as Keith Thomas brought this topic into the historiographical mainstream. Thomas references Yates, alongside Piyo M. Rattansi, for the basic point that hermetic thinking fed into the foundations of modern science, before being dispelled later.

The seminal studies of Michel Foucault and Frances Yates, even if not fully persuasive in every aspect, have made it impossible for historians ever again to ignore the role of various forms of magical thinking and practice in the Renaissance understanding of the natural world.

Yates's biographer Marjorie Jones asserted that Giordano Bruno and the Hermetic Tradition "galvanized Renaissance historiography" by illustrating how mysticism and magic had played a role in Renaissance culture and the scientific revolution. She further asserted that the book "brought [Yates] to the forefront of Renaissance studies."

== Reputation ==
Historian of religion Henrik Bogdan asserted that Yates's work was "instrumental in changing the attitude of historians of science and philosophy toward esotericism."

Although some of her conclusions would later be challenged by other scholars, Yates remains one of the major scholars of hermeticism in Renaissance Europe; and her book The Art of Memory (1966) has been named one of the most significant non-fiction books of the 20th century. Paolo Rossi identified two key points in it: the past importance and later loss of mnemotechnics as a human power, where he argues that she overstated the occult or "Jungian" aspect; and the subsequent marginalization of the area, which he considers valid and of wider applicability. Frances Yates and the Hermetic Tradition by Marjorie G. Jones, the first biography of Yates, was published in 2008 by Ibis Press.

In 2017, her work was discussed in a conference, London's Women Historians, held at the Institute of Historical Research.

=== Scholarly critiques ===
It is now said that Yates founded a paradigm, or gave out a grand narrative. In those terms, a so-called Yates paradigm (sometimes Yates Thesis), her work is contested freely. This is a view that Wouter Hanegraaff has put forth, starting with Yates as the scholar first to treat Renaissance hermeticism, integrated with Rosicrucianism, as a coherent aspect of European culture. He has stated it as an attractive paradox, the autonomous esotericism helping give birth to the scientific mentality that will be dismissive of its parent. But, it is now said, there was no unitary esoteric tradition and that view is only tenable on a selective reading of the evidence. The arguments surrounding this questioning of Yates include Lodovico Lazzarelli and the rival views of Antoine Faivre, who has proposed a clearer definition of esotericism.

Hanegraaff argued that the reception of Yates's work was coloured by the Zeitgeist. An extra assumption, that the magus had a point of view that could be recovered, was fashionably added. Further he argues that essentialist rather than nominalist use of the very term "esotericism" has vitiated succeeding work. The "Yates paradigm", in his view, dominated in the 1970s but fell by the wayside in the 1980s for scholars. Hints on the "Yates thesis" were left as sketches in works of Yates herself (Francis Bacon in relation to hermeticism, and the Hartlib circle, in particular). These related to paths, and how actual influence on science was effected.

Brian Vickers identifies Rattansi, A. G. Debus and Peter J. French as on the side of the Yates thesis, with M. B. Hesse, Edward Rosen, Paolo Rossi, and Charles Trinkaus on the other side. He notes that the debate (up to 1984) was not conducted by close reading of texts and evidence; he himself is entirely unconvinced by the thesis.

Yates's scholarship was often criticised for using what she termed her "powerful historical imagination"; she put forward scenarios that could not be proved using documentary evidence, something that many other historians saw as a flaw in her methodology.

But she "dealt with traditions whose remoteness she could not eliminate, even while she made them more understandable."

=== Influence on popular culture ===
John Crowley drew extensively on Yates for the occult motifs in Little, Big (1981) and the Ægypt series (1987–2007) in which she briefly appears as a character.

Philip Pullman was influenced by Giordano Bruno and the Hermetic Tradition for the design of the alethiometer in the His Dark Materials series (1995–2000).

== Personal life ==
Yates's biographer Marjorie G. Jones described the historian as a "deeply emotional, even passionate" woman, who was "depressive, moody, [and] frequently unhappy", as well as being fiercely determined and hard working. Jones noted that Yates remained a product of Victorian thought and value systems throughout her life. She was highly critical of nationalism, seeing it as the cause for the European wars of the early 20th century, and sought to find a solution to Europe's conflicts in history, particularly the 16th century. However, when it came to party politics, she was largely apolitical.

In 1942, she commented that "I am an Anglican who takes the historical view that the Nazi [i.e. Protestant] revolution of 1559, and all the miserable complications which ensued, deprived me of part of my natural and native inheritance as an English Catholic."

Yates's journals only allude to one potential romantic attachment, to a man named Leonard, although there is no evidence that they had a relationship. There is no evidence that she was ever sexually involved with another person, although her journals are filled with references to a personal struggle against temptation, which may refer to sexual thoughts.

== Works ==
- John Florio: The Life of an Italian in Shakespeare's England (1934)
- A study of Love's labour's lost (1936)
- The French Academies of the Sixteenth Century (1947)
- The Valois Tapestries (1959)
- Giordano Bruno and the Hermetic Tradition (1964) ISBN 9780226950075
- The Art of Memory (1966) ISBN 9780226950013
- Theatre of the World (1969)
- The Rosicrucian Enlightenment (1972)
- Astraea : The Imperial Theme in the Sixteenth Century (1975)
- Shakespeare's Last Plays: A New Approach (1975)
- The Occult Philosophy in the Elizabethan Age (1979)
- Lull and Bruno (1982) Collected Essays I
- Renaissance and Reform : The Italian Contribution (1983) Collected Essays II
- Ideas and Ideals in the North European Renaissance (1984) Collected Essays III

== See also ==
- Method of loci
- School of Night
- Women in the art history field
- Western esotericism and science
