= John Buller (composer) =

British composer (1927–2004)

John Buller (7 February 1927 – 12 September 2004) was a British composer.

== Career ==
John Buller was born in London on 7 February 1927. His musical career began as a chorister at St Matthew's, Westminster. Although the BBC accepted a work of his in 1946, he opted to earn his living as an architectural surveyor. Buller returned to music in his thirties, taking an external London University BMus in 1964 after private study with Anthony Milner. He gave up his surveying work in 1974 and from then was a full-time composer.

Perhaps his best known work is Proença (1977) for electric guitar, mezzo-soprano and orchestra, which was selected by the 1978 International Rostrum of Composers in Paris. Other works include The Mime of Mick, Nick and the Maggies (1978), The Theatre of Memory (1981), the opera Bakxai (1992), Bacchae Metres (1993) and Illusions (1997).

In his obituary for John Buller in the Guardian, Martin Wainwright wrote, '...John's discovery of Joyce fuelled him for most of his creative life, and I think what became fundamental to everything he composed was the Joycean notion that imagination is nothing but extended memory, that the commonplace of our musical or aural consciousness is virtually infinite, so that the task of the composer is to go down to the elements of musical consciousness and reorder them. His voice, in everything, came from this vision, and maybe that is why it embraced a wider than usual range of idioms and contrasts, including popular elements.'

Buller died in Sherborne, Dorset, aged 77 on 12 September 2004. Following his death, BBC Radio 3's contemporary music programme Hear and Now devoted an episode to Buller's music.

== Selected list of works ==
- The Cave (1970)
- Two Night Pieces from Finnegans Wake (1971)
- Scribenery (1971)
- The Melian Debate (1972)
- Finnegans Floras (1972)
- Poor Jenny (1973)
- Le Terrazze (1974)
- Proença, for mezzo, electric guitar and orchestra (1977)
- The Mime of Mick, Nick and the Maggies (1978)
- Theatre of Memory, for orchestra (1981)
- BAKXAI (The Bacchae) (1991–92)
- Bacchae Metres (1993)
- Mr Purcell's Maggot (1994)
- Illusions (1997)

== Personal life ==
One of Buller's sons is the British record producer Ed Buller.
