= The Art of Memory =

1966 non-fiction book by Frances A. Yates

- Author: Frances A. Yates
- Language: English
- Publisher: Routledge and Kegan Paul
- Publication date: 1966
- Publication place: United Kingdom
- Media type: Print (book)
- Pages: 400
- ISBN: 978-0-226-95001-3
- OCLC: 42905743
- Preceded by: Giordano Bruno and the Hermetic Tradition

The Art of Memory is a 1966 non-fiction book by British historian Frances A. Yates. The book follows the history of mnemonic systems from the classical period of Simonides of Ceos in Ancient Greece to the Renaissance era of Giordano Bruno, ending with Gottfried Leibniz and the early emergence of the scientific method in the 17th century.

According to the Stanford Encyclopedia of Philosophy, its publication was "an important stimulus to the flowering of experimental research on imagery and memory."

Modern Library included The Art of Memory on its list of 100 best nonfiction books.

== See also ==
- Art of memory
- Method of loci
