= Leon Woizikovsky =

Polish dancer, ballet master and choreographer (1899–1975)

- Leon Wójcikowski
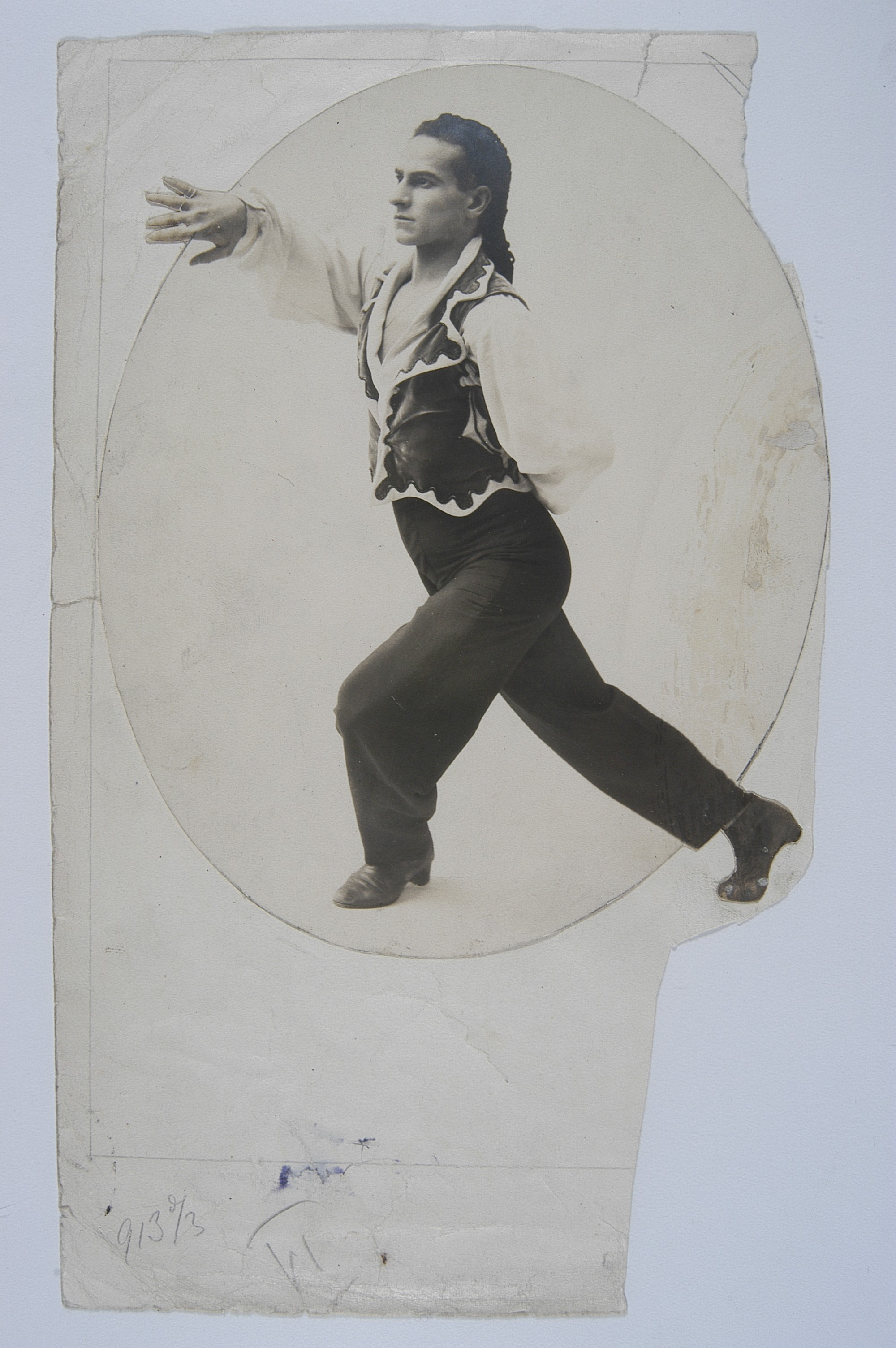
- Woizikovsky ca. 1925
- Born: February 20, 1899; Warsaw
- Died: February 23, 1975 (aged 76); Warsaw
- Employer(s): Grand Theatre, Warsaw, Ballets Russes, Pavlova, de Basil, de Valois, Ballet Polonaise, Massine, the London Festival, the Royal Flemish
- Known for: Ballet dance and choreography
- Spouse: Lydia Sokolova
- Honours: Officer's Cross, Order of Polonia Restituta

Leon Woizikovsky, originally Léon Wójcikowski (20 February 1899, Warsaw – 23 February 1975, Warsaw) was a Polish dancer and ballet master, and later choreographer and teacher. He first came to prominence as a member of the Ballets Russes. Later he worked with various ballet companies, e.g., Pavlova, de Basil, de Valois, Ballet Polonaise, Massine, the London Festival, the Royal Flemish.

== Career in ballet ==
Born in Warsaw, Woizikovsky trained in dance at its Grand Theatre, and with Enrico Cecchetti. He became known as a character dancer. His youthful career flourished with Ballets Russes. He and his dance partner, Lydia Sokolova, were eventually married. The very popular and innovative company performed cutting-edge choreographies by Fokine, Nijinsky, Massine, Nijinska, and Balanchine. Unfortunately, Diaghilev died in 1929 and his company folded. Thereafter, Woizikovsky's dance work often involved the repertoire of Ballets Russes. For various companies he also served as ballet master, and wrote choreography.

=== Diaghilev's Ballets Russes ===
In 1916 in Lausanne he joined Sergei Diaghilev's company Ballets Russes. Apparently, Diaghilev's Polish secretary on a recruiting assignment had found several dancers including the sixteen-year-old Woizikovsky. In the difficult circumstances of war-time Europe, the company took to the road in order to perform. Traveling twice to America, it included the world famous Vaslav Nijinsky. In a group that went to Spain with Diaghilev, Woizikovsky studied there flamenco and Spanish dance.

Leonid Massine was then the company's choreographer. In his ballets Woizikovsky performed, starting with Les Meninas in 1916, and in 1917 Parade and Contes Russes. That year also Woizikovsky in Les Femmes de bonne humeur masterfully played a dinner waiter who mimed the dishes ordered, e.g., spaghetti. In 1919 in La Boutique Fantasque he danced the tarantella with Lydia Sokolova, and in Le Tricorne he played the Miller (with Sokolova as the Miller's wife); later he played the Corregidor. In 1920: Massine's Le Astuzie and Pulcinella. In 1921 he took the part of 'the Negro' in the ballet Scheherazade, a part famously danced earlier by Nijinsky, and latter by Massine.

In 1921 Bronislava Nijinska became the company's choreographer. Woizikovsky performed in the 'Three Ivans', designed by Nijinska, added to the 1921 production of Petipa's The Sleeping Princess. Woizikovsky was in the production of her iconic Les Noces in 1923. The following year he played roles in Les Biches (as one of the two Athletes) and in Le Train bleu (as the Golfer). The Golfer role was "a pipe-smoking playboy, based on Edward, Prince of Wales". Lydia Sokolova later wrote about Woizikovsky's performance in the 'beach ballet' that was Le Train Bleu:

"Leon discovered me in a bathing hut" and removed [her] wrap. He "took a good look at me, put his pipe in his pocket, and danced with me the famous Train bleu waltz. He had to throw me up spinning in the air, then catch me as I came down." It was difficult "because my woollen costume was impossible to grip".

For the choreographer George Balanchine, newly arrived from Russia, and also for Massine who had returned to the company, Woizikovsky got ballet roles, e.g., in Balanchine's Prodigal Son of 1929 (as a companion to the son). When Diaghilev died in 1929, his Ballets Russes company disbanded.

=== Other companies, positions ===
Woizikovsky was thirty when Diaghilev died in 1929. That year he managed to join Pavlova's ballet company, which was often on tour. It turned out to be the very last years of this famous traveling dance ensemble. At The Hague in 1931 the world renowned Anna Pavlova suddenly died at the age of forty-nine.

Woizikovsky then signed with the new company Ballets Russes de Monte Carlo. It'd been formed by René Blum and Wassily de Basil in order to continue the project started by the late Diaghilev. Many of his former dancers had been recruited, and also his choreographers Balanchine and Massine. In 1932 Woizikovsky danced with Irina Baronova in Jeux d'Enfants, with designs by Henri Matisse. A dispute unfortunately arose between him and Massine, the source of contention being performance roles, especially for Le Tricorne. As a result, he left the company in 1934.

During the early 1930s, along with other Ballets Russes dancers (Karsavina, Idzikowski, Lopokova, Spessivtseva), he worked with the Vic-Wells company of Ninette de Valois in London. These well-known performers then provided "some legitimacy" to her nascent ballet company, which evolved to become The Royal Ballet.

In 1934 he formed his own company, Les Ballets de Leon Woizikovsky. His dancers included Blinova, Tarakanova, Raievska, Froman, Eglevsky, Youskevitch, and Sokolova. For the company he choreographed two ballets, Port Said (music by K. Konstantinov) and L'Amour sorcier (de Falla). In 1935 and 1936 the company visited London and Paris.

As the "ballet master and leading male dancer" Woizikovsky joined Wassily de Basil's company at Covent Garden. On a 62-member tour to Australia in 1936, the company opened in Adelaide where their dance arts became "a revelation". They "created a furor, the final performance climaxing with a fifteen-minute ovation." Further stops in Australia and New Zealand similarly inspired the public, which knew little first-hand of Diaghilev's ballet repertoire. Yet company's top management (the owner's rep and the attorney) quarreled and split. This eventually led to the rise of "artistic differences" between Jan Hoyer the régisseur (stage manager) and Woizikovsky. In turn the company's dancers then divided into two opposing groups. Yet outsiders, apparently, were little aware.

In 1938 Woizikovsky succeeded Bronislava Nijinska as director of the recently formed state-sponsored Ballet Polonais in Warsaw. He led the company to the 1939 World's Fair in New York City. Yet when the company arrived back home in Poland, both Nazi Germany and Soviet Russia were about to invade, starting World War II.

He managed to escape, rejoining Ballets Russes de Colonel W. de Basil in France. This company spent most of the next six years of war touring in the Americas. In 1945 Woizikovsky returned to devastated Warsaw. There he began to teach dance at the Opera school of Teatr Wielki (Grand Theater).

=== Latter years ===
In London Woizikovsky choreographed several ballets, staging his Petrushka in 1958 and his Sheherazade in 1960. These productions were for the London Festival Ballet, which he later served as ballet master. From time to time he staged other Diaghilev-era ballets, e.g., for the Cologne Ballet and for the Royal Flemish Ballet. He was ballet master for Massine's Ballet Europeo, e.g., at the 1960 Festival of Ballet in Genoa. He aided in the reconstruction of Nijinska's choreography for Le Train Bleu. Until the mid-1960s he was teaching at the Cologne Institute for Theatre Dance, and until 1974 at Bonn University. Then he returned to Warsaw.

== Lydia Sokolova ==
=== The relationship ===
British ballerina Lydia Sokolova (she had taken a Russian name) and Woizikovsky were both dancers in Ballets Russes, she from 1913 and he from 1916. In 1919 despite each being attached to another, they fell in love. In their dancing, they had sometimes been paired for performances, winning acclaim. In love, they began secretly to write to each other. Eventually, this uneasy situation was found out. It led to public confrontations, involving their alienated spouses (both dancers in the company) and each other. Diaghilev voiced his early disapproval. Sokolova had become elated, then fell woefully depressed. Nonetheless, the relationship endured its troubles, and bloomed, leading to their marriage.

The two then thrived for a time, sharing their lives as principal dancers in Ballets Russes, and briefly in other dance companies. Much later Sokolova would write, "If only he had resisted gambling, we might have been so happy." In 1929 on vacation in the south of France, at Le Lavandou, Lydia opened a newspaper carrying news of the sudden death in Venice of Sergei Diaghilev. Voicing her sorrow, she showed it to Leon.

"As the awful truth sank into my consciousness, my knees gave way... . When I looked up at last Leon was gone. Then I saw him in the distance walking along the edge of the sea, kicking the water with his foot."

=== Her observations ===
Sokolova remembered that she and Woizikovsky performed a certain pas de deux, a piece which in rehearsal "we enjoyed dancing though we did not think it anything special". Yet when their performance of it finished "the applause was thunderous". They took an "embarrassing" number of curtain calls.

Sokolova describes Woizikovsky as "never an actor, his talent was for genuine dancing". He had "a phenomenal photographic mind" which, e.g., allowed him to commit to memory pages of dance notations for Le Sacre Du Primtemps. When Leon was in his early-twenties, she writes, Diaghilev offered him an opportunity to try choreography, but it was too early in his career.

In an episode circa 1924, two dancers wanted to strike for a raise in salary against Diaghilev and Ballets Russes. Yet no other dancer quite agreed with them; the strike failed. The dancers then decided that after the night's performance:

"[A] small deputation should address Diaghilev... and Leon being the universal comrade was chosen to lead it. Diaghilev sauntered toward the group with a face of thunder. Leon went up to him and tried to put the dancers' point of view in some detail. After listening to him in silence, Diaghilev said, 'Leon, where are your friends?' When Leon looked around, there was not a soul in sight."

Circa 1916 at Hondarribia on the north coast of Spain near the French border, Sokolova was there when Leon saved a life, "Tariat, a French boy we had in the company, from drowning in a rough sea". Soon after another memorable event occurred. A small entourage of the dance company had an audience with the King and Queen of Spain. In the royal presence Leon accidentally kicked open a "huge backgammon box" sending its "discs spinning and rattling in every direction" as Diaghilev looked on.

== See also ==
- Lydia Sokolova
- Ballets Russes
- Bronislava Nijinska

== Bibliography ==
- Nancy Van Norman Baer, Bronislava Nijinsky. A dancer's life (Fine Arts Museum of San Francisco 1986).
- George Balanchine, Balanchine's complete stories of the Great Ballets (New York: Doubleday 1954).
- Lynn Garafola, Diaghilev's Ballets Russes (Wesleyan University 1989).
- Lynn Garafola, Legacies of twentieth-century Dance (Oxford University 2005, reprint: Da Capo Press).
- Vicente García-Márquez, The Ballets Russes. Colonel de Basil's Ballets Russes de Monte Carlo 1932-1952 (New York: Knopf 1990).
- Léonide Massine, My Life in Ballet (London: Macmillan 1968).
- Nancy Reynolds and Malcolm McCormick, No Fixed Points. Dance in the twentieth century (Yale University 2003).
- Richard Shead, Ballets Russes (Secaucus: Wellfleet 1989).
- Lydia Sokolova, Dancing with Diaghilev. Memoirs of Lydia Sokolova (London: John Murray 1960).
- Igor Stravinsky, Chronique de ma vie (Paris 1935), translated as An Autobiography (New York: Simon & Schuster 1936).
  - Lynn Garafola and Nancy Van Norman Baer, editors, The Ballets Russes and its World (Yale University 1999).
  - Horst Goegler, The concise Oxford dictionary of Dance (Oxford University 1977).
  - Robert Gottlieb, editor, Reading Dance (New York: Pantheon 2008).
- Carmen Paris & Javier Bayo, "Woizikovsky, Leon (1899-19175)", at MCNBiografías. Accessed 2018-3-27.
