= Irina Nijinska =

Russo-Polish dancer (1913–1991)

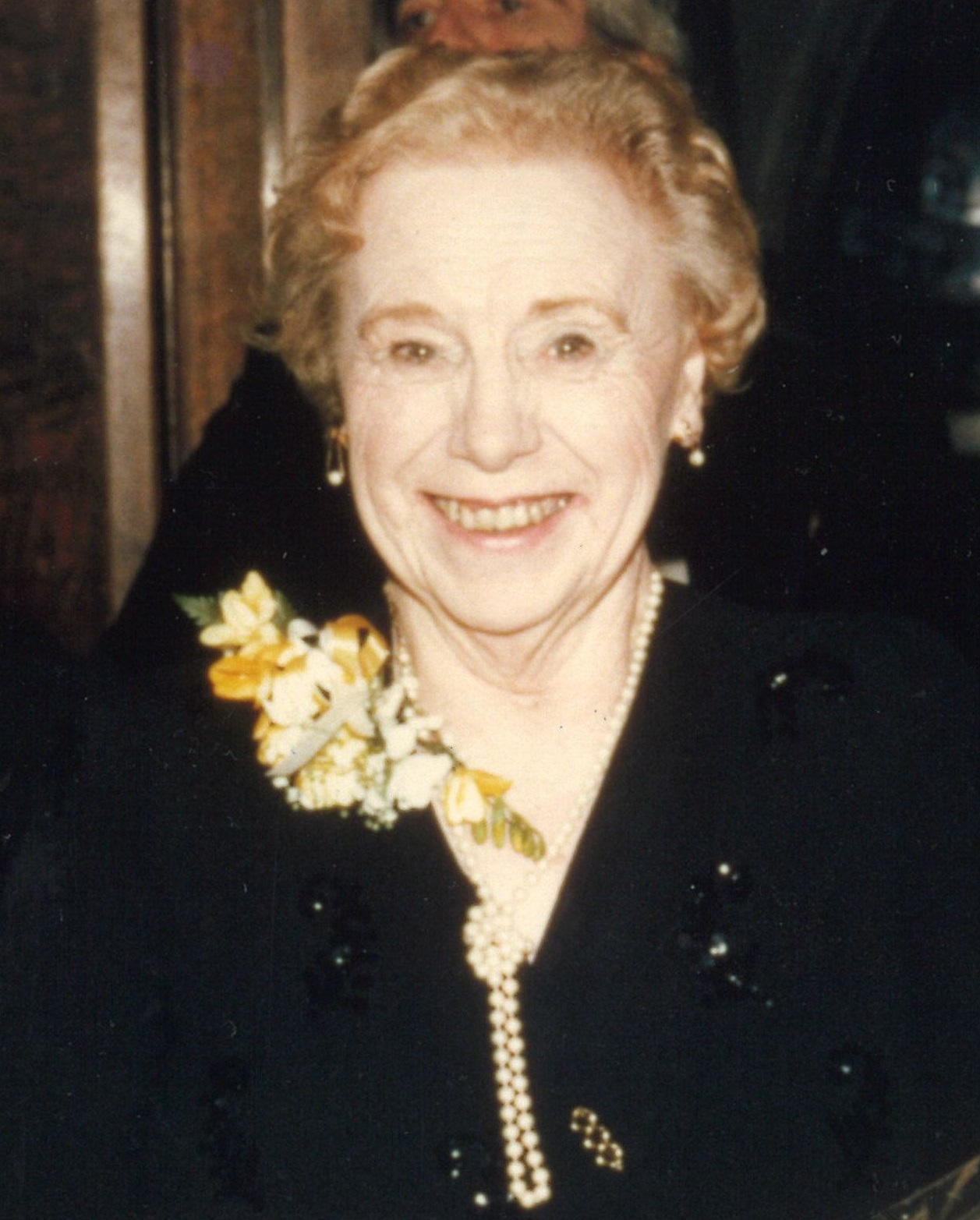
- Nijinska in 1986
- Born: 20 November 1913; St. Petersburg, Russia
- Died: 2 July 1991 (aged 77); Inglewood, California, U.S.
- Occupations: Ballet dancer; Ballet répétiteur
- Years active: 1930–1991

Irina Nijinska (20 November 1913 – 2 July 1991) was a Russian-Polish ballet dancer who performed with the company of Ida Rubinstein; in the Théatre de la Danse Nijinska; the Ballets Russes of Col. de Basil; the Polish Ballet, and other troupes. She spent much of her later life promoting the work of her mother, Bronislava Nijinska, the dancer and choreographer.

== Early life and education ==
Irina Nijinska was born in St. Petersburg, Russia. She was the daughter of Nijinska and dancer Alexander Kotchetovsky. Her uncle was the world famous dancer Vaslav Nijinsky; and her grandparents were dancers Thomas Nijinsky and Eleanora Bereda. After her brother Leo was born in Kiev in 1919, her parents separated. Her mother took her two children west in 1921, eventually settling in France. Irina trained as a dancer in Paris, studying with Vera Trefilova and Eugene Lapitsky, and beginning pointe work with her grandmother.

== Career ==
She made her debut with Olga Spessivtzeva's troupe in 1930 and went on to dance in many of the dance troupes with which her mother was associated, performing under the stage name Irina Istomina. Among other parts, she performed her mother's old role as the Street Dancer in Petrouchka. Like her relatives, she became known for the height of her jumps. In 1935 she was forced to interrupt her dancing career after suffering injuries in a car accident that killed her brother, Leo. During her convalescence, Irina first became an assistant to her mother, helping to stage the ballet Les Noces for Col. de Basil's Ballets Russes, in New York in 1936; and the ballet Le Baiser de la Fée in Buenos Aires. Much later, she helped her mother revive "Les Biches" for the Teatro dell'Opera in Rome in 1969; and for the Teatro Comunale in Florence in 1970.

Mother and daughter moved to Los Angeles in 1940, where both began teaching. She taught at Nijinska's Hollywood Dance Studio from 1941-1950.

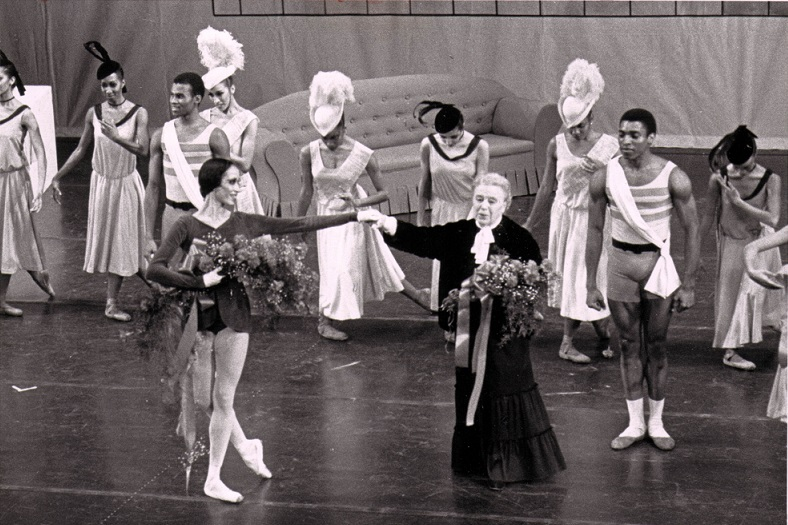
Virginia Johnson, Irina Nijinska and Eddie Shellman during the curtain calls after DTH's revival of Les Biches, 1983.

Following her mother's death in 1972, Irina co-edited and co-translated the first part of Bronislava's autobiography,, Early Memoirs, with Jean Rawlinson. She made the publishing arrangements and it appeared in 1981, being named a Notable Book of 1981 by the American Library Association. She also continued working with the revivals of Bronislava's original choreographies, produced at different ballet-company venues. By her own estimate, between 1972 and 1991 Irina Nijinska produced 26 stagings for 20 different ballet companies in Europe, America, and Asia. Oakland Ballet's production of "Les Noces" in 1981 saw the first American performances of Nijinska's ballet since 1936. Irina also staged Les Biches for Oakland Ballet in 1982; and assisted Frank W.D. Ries, a Jean Cocteau scholar, in the reconstruction of Le Train Bleu in Oakland, in 1989. She developed close ties with the Dance Theatre of Harlem, in New York, where she staged "Les Biches" in 1983, and in 1989 staged a full evening of works by Bronislava Nijinska including "Les Biches," "Les Noces," and "Rondo Capriccioso," the latter reconstructed with the assistance of Rosella Hightower. Irina's staging of "Les Noces" for the Feld Ballet, in 1985, was notable for the design of a new set by Ming Cho Lee. In 1990, Irina revived the Bride's Variation from "Le Baiser de la Fée" for a conference sponsored by the Dance Critics Association. That performance featured a young Jennie Somogyi, later a principal dancer with New York City Ballet.

Irina Nijinska was also instrumental in promoting her mother's works through her involvement in two historic museum exhibitions. "Bronislava Nijinska: a Dancer's Legacy," was curated by Nancy Van Norman Baer and first seen at the Cooper-Hewitt Museum in New York, from March to July of 1986, then at the California Palace of the Legion of Honor in San Francisco, from September 1986 to January 1987. "La Nijinska: Choreographer, Dancer, Teacher" was curated by Madeleine Nichols and exhibited at the Dance Collection of the New York Public Library, from December 1990 through April 1991, commemorating the 100th anniversary of Bronislava Nijinska's birth.

== Death ==
In 2 July 1991 at age 77, Irina Nijinska died in a hospital room in Inglewood, California, after suffering a stroke on May 29, in Amsterdam. Family members, friends, and colleagues gathered to pay tribute to her at a symposium at the New York Public Library for the Performing Arts in November 1991.

== Personal life ==
In 1946 Irina had married Gibbs S. Raetz; they had two children, Natalie and George.

== List of Stagings ==
"Les Biches:" Dusseldorf ballet, 1972; Zurich Ballet, 1975; Théâtre Français de Nancy, 1981; Oakland Ballet, 1982; Dance Theatre of Harlem, 1983; Dutch National Ballet, 1983; Teatro dell'Opera in Rome, 1985; Missouri Concert Ballet, 1989; Tulsa Ballet, 1990; Paris Opéra Ballet, 1991

"Les Noces:" Stuttgart Ballet, 1974; Paris Opéra Ballet, 1976; Oakland Ballet, 1981; Dance Corps at the State University of New York at Purchase, 1984; Feld Ballet, 1985; Pittsburgh Ballet, 1985; Compañía Nacional de Danza, Mexico, 1987; Les Grands Ballets Canadiens, 1987; Vienna State Opera Ballet, 1988; Washington Ballet, 1988; Joffrey Ballet, 1989; Dance Theatre of Harlem, 1989; National Institute for the Arts, Taipei, 1991; Dutch National Ballet, 1991.

"Le Train Bleu:" Oakland Ballet, 1989

"Rondo Capriccioso;" Dance Theatre of Harlem, 1989

Bride's Variation from "Le Baiser de la Fée": Dance Critics Association, 1990

== On-line obituaries ==
- Jack Anderson, " Irina Nijinska, 77, Champion of her Mother's Works, is Dead", in The New York Times, July 4, 1991.
- "Irina Nijinska: Restaged Historic Ballets", in The Los Angeles Times, July 6, 1991.
