= Hilda Butsova =

English ballet dancer (1896–1976)

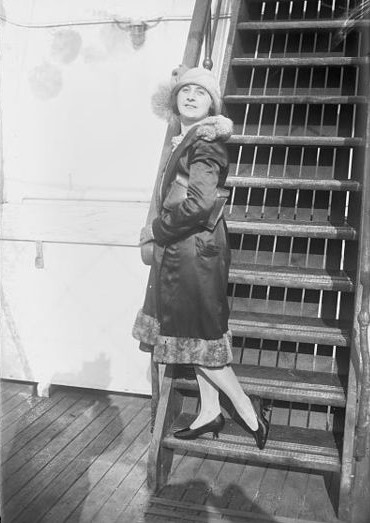
- Born: Hilda Boot; July 11, 1896; Nottingham, Nottinghamshire, England, U.K.
- Died: March 21, 1976 (aged 79); Scarsdale, New York, U.S.
- Other names: Hilda Boot Mills
- Occupation: Dancer
- Spouse: Harry Mills (m. 1925)
- Children: 1

Hilda Butsova (born Hilda Boot, July 11, 1896 – March 21, 1976), was an English ballet dancer, a member of the companies of Russian dancers Anna Pavlova and Mikhail Mordkin.

== Early life ==
Hilda Boot was born in Nottingham. She trained as a dancer at Stedman's Dancing Academy, and then with Alexandre Volinine and Enrico Cecchetti.

== Career ==
Boot was selected in 1912 to join Anna Pavlova's touring company, along with fellow English dancer Muriel Stuart, when both were young. Boot's professional name was changed to "Butsova" at this time. Boot and Stuart were soloists with the Pavlova company until 1925. She danced on the London stage in productions of The Fairy Doll (1920, 1924, 1925), Visions (1924, 1925), A Polish Wedding (1924, 1925), Amarilla (1924, 1925), La fille mal gardée (1925), Coppélia (1925), and Magic Flute (1927).

Butsova joined Mikhail Mordkin's company, and toured with them for a few years. In 1931, she was ballet mistress at the Little Playhouse in Cincinnati, Ohio. She retired from full-time performing in 1932.

In her later years she was a dance instructor in New York City, and the North Carolina School of the Arts. In 1940s she taught courses with the Dance Educators of America. She and Muriel Stuart spoke at a commemorative event in New York in 1956, marking the 25th anniversary of Anna Pavlova's death. She directed a ballet in Scranton, Pennsylvania in 1959. In 1974, she created original choreography, Dress Rehearsal, for the civic ballet of Greenville, South Carolina. She gave an oral history interview about her dancing years in 1975.

== Personal life ==
Hilda Butsova married theatrical manager Harry Mills in 1925. They had a son, Alan. She died in 1976, aged 79 years, after a heart attack in Scarsdale, New York.
