= Le Train Bleu (ballet) =

Ballet by Darius Milhaud

Le train bleu
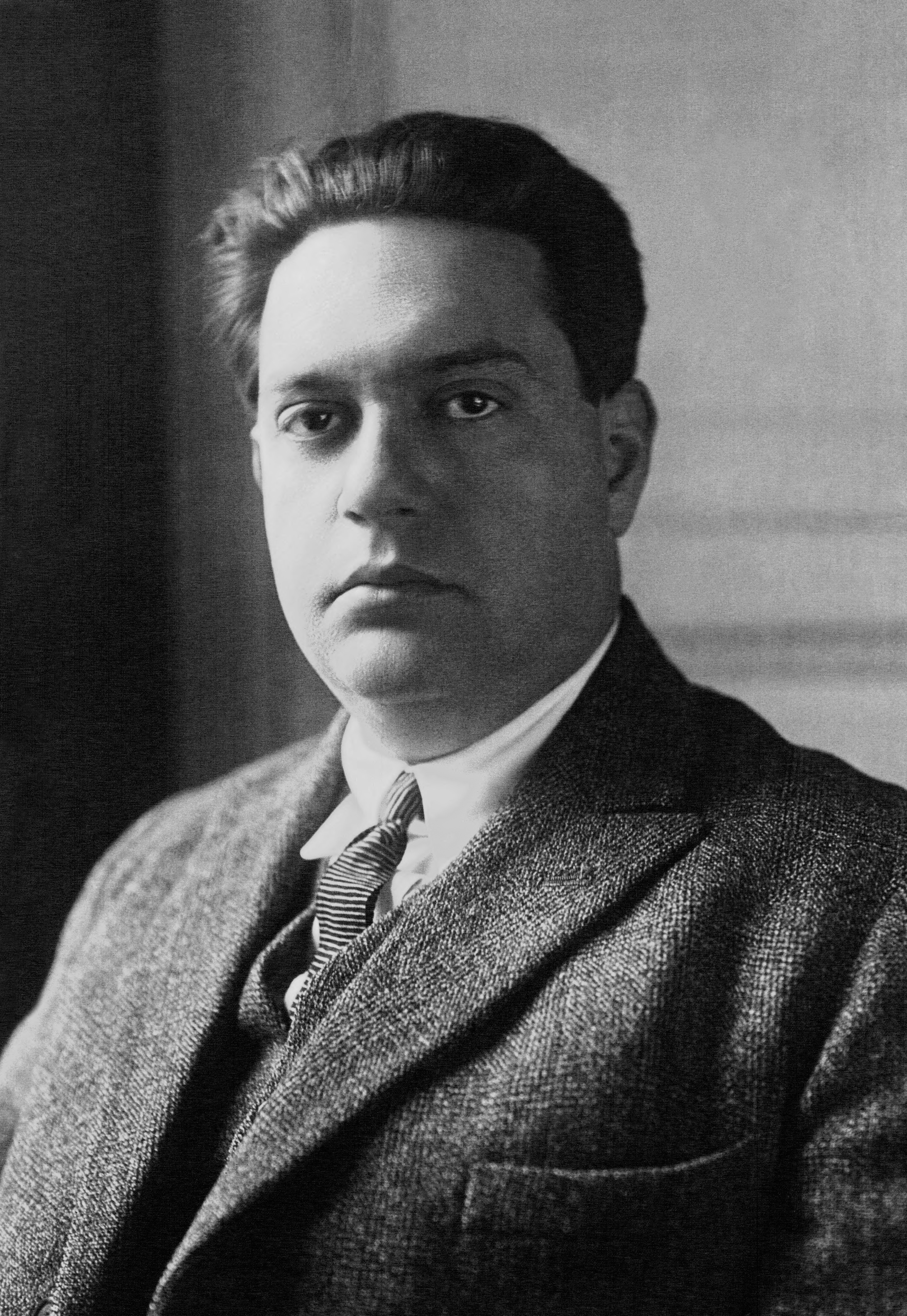
- Darius Milhaud in 1923.
- Choreographer: Bronislava Nijinska
- Music: Darius Milhaud
- Premiere: 20 June 1924; Théâtre des Champs-Élysées, Paris
- Original ballet company: Ballets russes

Le train bleu is a one-act ballet choreographed by Bronislava Nijinska to music by Darius Milhaud for Serge Diaghilev's Ballets Russes, based on a scenario by Jean Cocteau. The title was taken from the night train called Le Train Bleu, which transported wealthy passengers from Calais to the Mediterranean Sea.

The ballet is set on the fashionable French Riviera and has a sporting theme, with swimmers, tennis players, and weight lifters. Henri Laurens supplied a Cubist beach scene and Coco Chanel outfitted the cast in sportswear. The curtain was painted after Deux femmes courant sur la plage, a 1922 work by Pablo Picasso.

The ballet was first performed on 20 June 1924 at the Théâtre des Champs-Élysées in Paris, with Nijinska, who played a tennis player based on Suzanne Lenglen, Lydia Sokolova, Anton Dolin and Leon Woizikovsky in the leading roles. The orchestra was conducted by André Messager.

== Sections ==
- Introduction
- Choeur des poules et des gigolos
- Entrée de Beau-Gosse
- Entrée de Perlouse
- Rentrée de Beau-Gosse
- Choeur des poules et des gigolos (farce des cabines et scène de l'avion)
- Entrée de la championne de tennis et couplets avec Beau-Gosse
- Entrée du joueur de golf et valse avec Perlouse
- Introduction et duo de Beau-Gosse et de Perlouse
- Choeur des poules et des gigolos; Fugue de l'engueulade
- Final du chapeau.

== Notes ==
- Richard Buckle's biography of Diaghilev made a mistake in citing the setting as Deauville. Deauville was a fashionable resort in Normandy, and it was not on the line of the Blue Train.
