= La Boutique fantasque =

Ballet in one act conceived by Léonide Massine

The Magic Toyshop
- Poster for La Boutique fantasque. The can-can dancers are in the foreground with the other characters visible in the background.
- Native title: La Boutique fantasque
- Choreographer: Léonide Massine
- Music: Ottorino Respighi (based on piano pieces by Gioachino Rossini)
- Libretto: André Derain
- Premiere: 5 June 1919; Alhambra Theatre, London, U.K.
- Original ballet company: Ballets Russes
- Characters: Shopkeeper; Shop Assistant; Russian Merchant; Tarantella Dancers; Queen of Clubs; Queen of Hearts; The Snob; Cossack Chief; Dancing Poodles; Can-can Dancers
- Design: André Derain
- Setting: 1860s France
- Created for: Enrico Cecchetti; Nicolas Zverev; Lydia Lopokova; Léonide Massine

La Boutique fantasque, also known as The Magic Toyshop or The Fantastic Toyshop, is a ballet in one act conceived by Léonide Massine, who devised the choreography for a libretto written with the artist André Derain, a pioneer of Fauvism. Derain also designed the décor and costumes for the ballet. Ottorino Respighi wrote the music based on piano pieces by Gioachino Rossini. Its world premiere was at the Alhambra Theatre in London on 5 June 1919, performed by Sergei Diaghilev's Ballets Russes.

Massine described how, in Rome for a ballet season, Respighi brought the score of Rossini's Péchés de vieillesse to Diaghilev. The impresario played them to Massine and Respighi. Toulouse-Lautrec was an influence on the period setting and style of La Boutique fantasque, and Massine envisaged the principal character "quite Lautrec-like". Diaghilev arranged for Massine to meet Derain in Paris, and they worked out the scenario with the artist's marionette theatre at his home on the rue Bonaparte. The date of the action was moved from 1832 to the 1860s.

The story of the ballet has similarities to Die Puppenfee ("The Fairy Doll") of Josef Bayer, an old German ballet that had been performed by Jose Mendez in Moscow in 1897 and by Serge and Nicholas Legat in Saint Petersburg in 1903. Others note the similarities to Hans Christian Andersen's The Steadfast Tin Soldier.

Massine's scenario centers on the love story between two can-can dancer dolls in a toyshop, incorporating elements of comedy, national folk dance and mime, as well as classical choreography.

== Story ==
The ballet is set in France in 1860. A world-famous toymaker has created exquisite dancing dolls in his magic toyshop. The automata perform various dance routines for the prospective customers. At first the toys entertain two English ladies and an American family. Some dolls perform a tarantella for the guests, followed by other dolls dressed as playing cards who dance a mazurka. Then two dolls come in and perform another routine involving a snob and a melon vendor. New customers arrive, a Russian family, and everyone welcomes them. Five Cossack dolls enter and perform a traditional dance, followed by an animal act featuring two dancing poodles.

Then the shop-keeper introduces his most sophisticated dancing dolls, a pair of can-can dancers, a flashly-dressed man and girl, come in and perform their routine. Their dance is so enchanting that the American family decides to buy the male doll while the Russian family buys the female dancing doll. The deals are made and paid for, the dolls are placed in separate boxes and collection is arranged for the next day.

Darkness descends, but during the night, the dolls magically come to life and start dancing. They are upset that the two can-can dancers who are lovers are going to be separated, and a plot is hatched to hide them before the customers return in the morning.

When the shop opens the next day and the customers come in to pick up their dolls, they discover that the can-can dancers are no longer there. The customers, not knowing about the secret life of the dolls, blame the shop owner and attack him and his assistant. In the ensuing fracas, the dolls come to the shopkeeper's rescue with the Cossack dolls attacking the customers with their bayonets. Driven out of the shop, the customers watch incredulously through the window as the happy dolls and the shopkeeper dance merrily inside with the re-united can-can dancers.

== Original cast ==
Among the large cast in the original production were:

- Enrico Cecchetti as Shopkeeper
- Alexander Gavrilov as Shop Assistant, described by Buckle as "characters of Dickensian eccentricity"
- Serge Grigoriev as Russian Merchant
- Lydia Sokolova and Leon Woizikowski as Tarantella Dancers
- Lubov Tchernicheva as Queen of Clubs
- Vera Nemchinova as Queen of Hearts
- Stanislas Idzikowski as The Snob – "a caricature of an English dandy"
- Nicolas Zverev as Cossack Chief
- Vera Clark and Nicholas Kremnev as Dancing Poodles
- Lydia Lopokova and Léonide Massine as Can-can Dancers – who imitated the "contortions of Lautrec's Valentin le désossé"

== Performance history ==
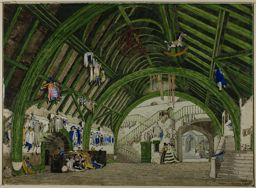
Set design for the boutique by Léon Bakst (1918/24)

According to ballet historian Cyril Beaumont, the first night was packed with well-known artists and performers eagerly awaiting the new ballet. Picasso made a sketch of Massine and Lopukhova in their final pose. Paris saw La Boutique fantasque for the first time on Christmas Eve 1919. Despite Massine's dismissal from the Ballets Russes in early January 1921, the ballet was revived in the following May at the Prince's Theatre in London and at the Gaîté-Lyrique in Paris in 1925 and on tour in Europe in the following years, and was on the bill of the final performance of Diaghilev's company in Vichy on 4 August 1929; the impresario died two weeks later in Venice.

The enormous success of Colonel de Basil's Ballet Russe de Monte Carlo in Europe and America prompted J.C. Williamson Management to arrange the company's first tour to Australia and New Zealand. Thus, La Boutique fantasque was the first ballet by Léonide Massine to be performed in Australia. It had its Australian premiere at the Theatre Royal, Adelaide, during the opening night of the Ballets Russe de Monte Carlo tour on 13 October 1936. Valentina Blinova and Leon Woizikowski were particularly celebrated as the can-can dancers.

When Massine left the company of Colonel de Basil in 1937, La Boutique fantasque was among the works involved in a copyright dispute. Following a legal ruling in 1937, de Basil was no longer allowed to perform pre-1932 works by Massine. The performance rights then reverted to the choreographer.

Massine subsequently mounted the work for the re-formed Ballet Russe de Monte Carlo some time in 1939, where it formed a triptych of high-spirited ballets with his Gaîté Parisienne and Le Beau Danube. The ballerina roles in all three ballets became indelibly associated with the elegant and witty interpretations of Alexandra Danilova.

Massine mounted La Boutique fantasque for Ballet Theatre, later known as American Ballet Theatre, in 1942 and its American premiere took place at the Central High School Auditorium in Omaha, Nebraska, on 4 January 1943. Among the cast were Simon Semenoff (Shopkeeper), Nicolas Orloff (Shop Assistant), Muriel Bentley (English Old Maid), Antony Tudor (American Patron), Jerome Robbins (American Boy), Nora Kaye and Yurek Lazowsky (Tarantella Dancers), John Taras (Melon Hawker), André Eglevsky (Cossack Chief), Karen Conrad and John Kriza (Dancing Poodles), and Irina Baronova and Léonide Massine (Can-can Dancers).

The Royal Ballet in London mounted the work in 1947 as part of the renewal of its repertoire for Covent Garden; Massine was in charge of the production and danced his original role. In 1948, Danilova appeared alongside him. The Royal Ballet touring company revived the piece in Stratford in 1968 and it remained in their repertory for several years after, and Massine returned to coach the company for the 1978 run.

== Score ==
Buckle notes that as the ballet took shape it became clear that each musical number was "perfect of its kind" and that there was ample variety of tunes and related dances. The Rossini piano works used include Gherkins, Radishes, Butterflies, Themes in Variation, Almonds, Petit Caprice (Style Offenbach), Tarantelle pur Sang, Castor Oil, Abortive polka, and La Danza.

The music was a major contribution to the success of the ballet, whose score was well-orchestrated, kept Rossini's harmonies, and generally retained his phrasing unaltered while investing his melodies with a new breadth. The instrumentation is piccolo, 2 flutes, 2 oboes, cor anglais, 2 clarinets, 2 bassoons, 4 horns, 3 trumpets, 3 trombones, tuba, timpani, bass drum, side drum, xylophone, percussion, celesta, harp and strings.

=== Sections of complete ballet ===
1. Overture (Tempo di Marcia) – Allegretto – Meno mosso – Mème mouvement – Vivo
2. Tarantella (Allegro con brio) 'La Danza' – Vivo
3. Mazurka – Vivo – Lento – Moderato – Più vivo – Poco meno – Vivacissimo
4. Danse Cosaque (Allegretto marcato) – Animando un poco – Vivo – Allegretto brillante (Valse) – Vivace
5. Can–Can (Allegretto grottesco) 'Petite Caprice Style Offenbach' – Vivacissimo – Poco meno vivo – Andantino mosso
6. Valse lente (Andantino moderato) – Un poco più mosso – Con brio – Tempo I° – Più animato – Tempo I° – Pizzicato, Allegretto moderato – Allegretto moderato
7. Nocturne (Andantino) – Allegretto
8. Galop (Vivacissimo) – Fuga, Allegro brillante – Prestissimo – Tempo I°

=== Rossini's piano works arranged by Respighi ===
- Vol. IV. Quatre hors d'œuvres, No. 3 Les cornichons, "Introduction"
- Vol. IV. Quatre hors d'œuvres, No. 1 Les radis
- Vol. IV. Quatre hors d'œuvres, No. 4 La beurre, "Thème et Variations"
- Vol. IV. Quatre mendiants, No. 2 Les amandes, "Minuit sonne – bonsoir madame"
- Vol. X. No. 6 Petite Caprice (Style Offenbach)
- Vol. VIII. No. 9 Tarantelle pur sang (avec traversée de la procession)
- Vol. VII. No. 6 Petite Valse, L'huile de ricin
- Vol. VI. No. 10 Fausse couche de Polka Mazurka
- "La danza" (1835) Tarantelle napolitaine

== Recordings ==
Respighi's score soon took on an existence of its own in the concert hall as a suite. It has been performed many times and is enduringly popular on record. Recordings have included the following:

- Decca Symphony Orchestra, Julian Clifford (Decca) 1929
- London Philharmonic Orchestra, Eugene Goossens (HMV) 1936
- London Symphony Orchestra, Ernest Ansermet (Everest/Decca) 1950
- Orchestra of the Royal Opera House, Covent Garden, Hugo Rignold (Parlophone) 1951
- Philharmonia Orchestra, Robert Irving, (HMV) 1952
- Philharmonia Orchestra, Alceo Galliera, (Columbia) 1953
- RIAS Symphony Orchestra, Ferenc Fricsay (Deutsche Grammophon) 1955
- Boston Pops Orchestra, Arthur Fiedler (RCA)
- Israel Philharmonic Orchestra, Georg Solti (Decca) 1957
- Royal Philharmonic Orchestra, Eugene Goossens (HMV) 1957
- London Philharmonic Orchestra, René Leibowitz (Urania) 1958
- Philharmonia Orchestra, Alceo Galliera, (Columbia) 1959
- Lamoureux Orchestra, Roberto Benzi (Philips) 1960
- Philadelphia Orchestra, Eugene Ormandy (CBS) 1965
- Royal Philharmonic Orchestra, Antal Doráti (Decca) 1976
- London Symphony Orchestra, Lamberto Gardelli (HMV) 1978
- Toronto Symphony Orchestra, Andrew Davis (CBS) 1979
- National Philharmonic Orchestra, Richard Bonynge (Decca) 1981
- Los Angeles Philharmonic Orchestra, Neville Marriner (Philips)
- Montreal Symphony Orchestra, Charles Dutoit (Decca) 1996
- Cincinnati Symphony Orchestra, Jesús López-Cobos (Telarc)
- BBC Philharmonic, Gianandrea Noseda (Chandos) 2002
- Orchestre Philharmonique Royal de Liège, John Neschling (BIS) 2014
