= Les Biches =

Ballet by Francis Poulenc

Poulenc in the early 1920s

Les Biches (French: [le biʃ]; The Hinds or The Does, or The Darlings) (Note: An untranslatable term, in this context. The literal meaning of "biche" is a young female deer, and can also be used as a term of affection for a young woman, but for the nuances of the term in French usage see the main text of the article.) is a one-act ballet to music by Francis Poulenc, choreographed by Bronislava Nijinska and premiered by the Ballets Russes on 6 January 1924 at the Salle Garnier in Monte Carlo. Nijinska danced the central role of the Hostess. The ballet has no story, and depicts the random interactions of a group of mainly young people in a house party on a summer afternoon.

The ballet was seen in Paris and London within a year of its premiere, and has been frequently revived there; it was not produced in New York until 1950. Nijinska directed revivals of the ballet for several companies in the four decades after its creation. Les Biches, with recreations of Marie Laurencin's original costumes and scenery, remains in the repertoire of the Paris Opera Ballet, the Royal Ballet and other companies. The music has been used for later ballets, although they have not followed Nijinska's in gaining a place in the regular repertoire.

The music for the original ballet contains three choral numbers. Poulenc made the choral parts optional when he revised the score in 1939–1940, and the work is usually given with wholly orchestral accompaniment. The composer extracted a five-movement suite from the score, for concert performance. The suite has been recorded for LP and CD from the 1950s onwards.

== Background ==
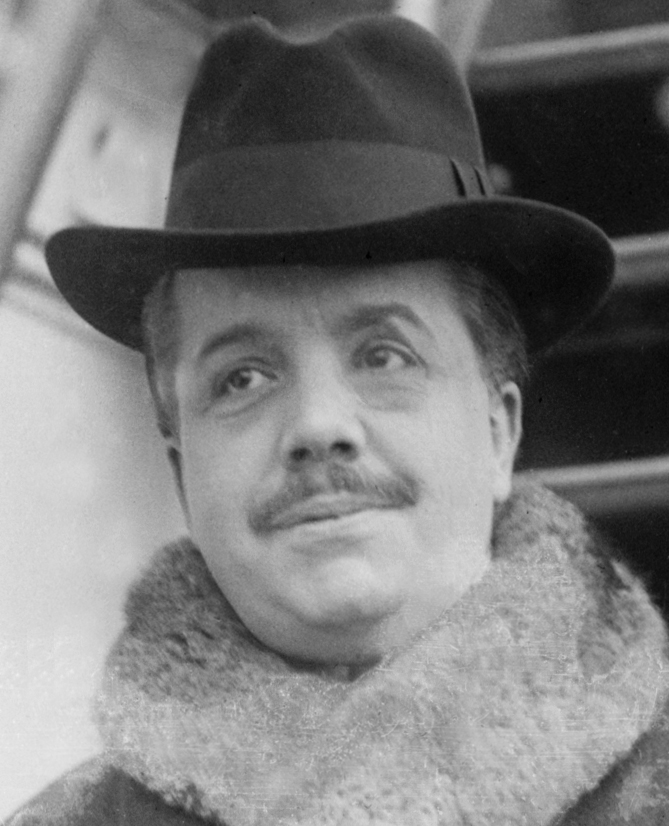
Sergei Diaghilev

Sergei Diaghilev, proprietor of the Ballets Russes, contacted Poulenc in November 1921 with a proposed commission. (Note: According to Poulenc's biographer Carl B. Schmidt, it is possible that Jean Cocteau, the guiding force of Les six, put the idea into Diaghilev's mind, but it is also possible that Cocteau was retrospectively exaggerating any input he may have had.) The original plan was that Poulenc should write music for a ballet scenario with the title Les Demoiselles, written by the fashion designer Germaine Bongard. The following July it became clear that Bongard did not wish to go ahead; Poulenc wrote to his friend and fellow member of Les Six, Darius Milhaud, that instead "I will probably write a suite of dances without a libretto." At about the same time he told Igor Stravinsky that after consulting Diaghilev and the designer, Marie Laurencin, "I have a clear conception of my ballet which will have no subject – simply dances and songs."

The titles of the numbers in the score indicate that Poulenc followed this plan, but he nonetheless retained two important features of Bongarďs proposed work: a choral element, with unseen singers giving a commentary on the action, and the "demoiselles". In an analysis published in The Musical Quarterly in 2012, Christopher Moore describes the former as reminiscent of Stravinsky's Pulcinella, and the latter as "a corps de ballet of flirtatious young women". For the words, Poulenc spent a considerable amount of time in the Bibliothèque nationale de France, seeking out texts for the choral interjections. He found what his biographer Carl B. Schmidt describes as "some slightly obscene eighteenth-century texts", which he used in three of the numbers in the score.

Poulenc struggled to find the right name for the ballet, and eventually had the idea of calling it Les Biches, echoing the title of the classic ballet Les Sylphides. His chosen title is, as he admitted, untranslatable into any other language. (Note: Commenting on this fact, Poulenc observed that in London the ballet was given under the title House Party.) The word biche is usually translated as "doe", an adult female deer; it was also used as a slang term for a coquettish woman. Moore expands on the definition: "As has been often noted, the word biches is itself pregnant with double entendre, referring most obviously to does, but also, in the underworld of Parisian slang, to a woman (or ironically, a man) of deviant sexual proclivities." (Note: The Dictionnaire de l'Académie française gives these definitions in addition to the zoological one: "Fam. Terme d'affection adressé à une fillette ou à une femme. Vieilli et fam. Élégante demi-mondaine, femme entretenue. Les biches du Second Empire" (Familiar: A term of affection addressed to a girl or a woman. Old-fashioned, familiar: Elegant demi-mondaine, kept woman. The "biches" of the Second Empire.))

By the middle of 1923 Poulenc had completed the first version of the score, after some help with details of orchestration from his teacher, Charles Koechlin. In late October, at Diaghilev's request, he travelled to Monte Carlo to help supervise the production. The composer was delighted with the work of the choreographer, Nijinska, which he described as "ravishing"; he wrote to Milhaud that she had truly understood his score. Between November 1923 and the premiere in January 1924, Poulenc, together with Nijinska, oversaw, by his estimate, "at least 72 rehearsals or close to 250 hours of work". Les Biches was an immediate success, first in Monte Carlo in January 1924 and then in Paris in May, under the direction of André Messager and has remained one of Poulenc's best-known scores. Poulenc's new celebrity after the success of the ballet was the unexpected cause of his estrangement from Erik Satie, of whom he had been a protégé: among the new friends Poulenc made was Louis Laloy, a writer whom Satie regarded with implacable enmity. Poulenc's friend, Georges Auric, who had just enjoyed a similar triumph with a Diaghilev ballet, Les Fâcheux, was also repudiated by Satie for becoming a friend of Laloy.

== Music ==
Poulenc revised the orchestration comprehensively in 1939–1940 (published 1947). He extracted a five-movement suite from the full ballet score (1948), omitting the overture and the three choral movements. The suite is dedicated to Misia Sert. The published score specifies the following instruments: woodwind: 1 piccolo, 2 flutes, 2 oboes, 1 cor anglais, 2 clarinets, 1 bass clarinet, 2 bassoons, 1 contrabassoon; brass: 4 French horns, 3 trumpets, 3 trombones, 1 tuba; percussion: percussion bass drum, field drum, glockenspiel, snare drum, suspended cymbal, tambourine, tenor drum, triangle; celeste, glockenspiel; and strings.

The score of Les Biches is sometimes described as neoclassical. The form of the piece – an overture followed by a number of unlinked movements – follows 18th-century musical practice, and Poulenc set out to follow classical precedent in his tonal and harmonic writing. He wrote to Milhaud:

Les Biches will be very clear, sturdy and classical. The opening ensemble fluctuates between F major, dominant, sub-dominant, relative minor, etc ... just like the finales of classical symphonies; "Jeu" is in E, B, A, etc... and the final "Rondeau" is in D, A, G, etc. For the songs, I have some beautiful but slightly obscene texts (from the 18th century).

The analyst Gérald Hugon writes that other influences on the young composer's score are French eighteenth-century song (in the Rondeau), ragtime (in the Rag-Mazurka) and composers ranging from the classical era (Mozart and Schubert) to contemporaries such as Stravinsky and Prokofiev, via Tchaikovsky: Hugon quotes Claude Rostand's comment that according to Poulenc the Adagietto was inspired by a variation from The Sleeping Beauty. Poulenc's biographer Henri Hell finds the score "irresistibly evoking the art of Domenico Scarlatti".

The complete ballet score comprises an overture followed by eight movements. The second (Chanson dansée), fourth (Jeu) and seventh (Petite chanson dansée) contain parts for unseen chorus. The published score stipulates a minimum of twelve singers (four sopranos, four tenors, four baritones), although it also seems to indicate that at the premiere there was only one voice to each part. (Note: "Artistes du chant (Monte-Carlo): Mme Romanitza; M. Fouquet (ténor); M. Cérésol (baryton)".) When Poulenc revised the score he made the vocal parts optional.

=== Ouverture ===
The overture begins quietly, in 4/8 time in C major with a slow duet, marked tranquillo, for flute and bass clarinet. After about one minute the rest of the orchestra enters, the key changes to E major and the tempo to allegro vivace. After several changes of time signature the overture ends with a reprise, at a faster tempo, of the opening theme. The playing time is about 3 minutes and 30 seconds.

=== Rondeau ===
After a three bar introduction marked "very slow", the Rondeau switches to an energetic allegro molto in F major. The movement is dominated by a theme for trumpet which recurs throughout. The central section, marked "très calme", is quieter and slower. The boisterous first theme returns to round off the movement.

=== Chanson dansée ===
"Chanson dansée": text and translation

Men's voices only.

Qu'est-ce qu'Amour,
le connais-tu, Grégoire?
Qu'est-ce qu'Amour,
dis-moi, le connais-tu?
Tra la la la la.
L'Amour est un chat
qui te guette et t'attrapera.
L'Amour est un chat
qui t'attrapera.
A bon chat bon rat,
je sais/tu peux boire
Les chats et les Amours
aiment à folâtrer,
et sitôt qu'on les flatte
font patte de velours
Buveurs gardez-vous de la patte,
de la patte de l'amour.
L'Amour est un chat
qui t'attrapera.

What is Love?
Do you know, Grégoire?
What is Love –
Tell me: do you know?
Tra-la-la-la-la!
Love is a cat
that is watching you, and will catch you.
Love is a cat
that will catch you.
Tit for tat!
I know how/you can drink.
Cats and Loves
like to sport,
and when we pet them
they become velvet-pawed.
Drinkers, beware of
Love's paw.
Love is a cat
that will catch you.

This movement is the first of the three choral sections in the original version of the ballet; it is for male voices with orchestral accompaniment. It begins quietly, with a theme marked "quieto", which in its five bars switches between 4/8 and 6/8 time. This is followed by a strongly rhythmic song for male voices, beginning in 2/4 time in D major, with a later interlude where the key switches to D♭. The original theme returns to conclude the movement.

=== Adagietto ===
The plaintive melancholy of the Adagietto finds Poulenc at his most affecting, in the view of the analyst Paul Horsley. It is dominated by a gentle oboe theme in its outer sections, and unlike much of the score it does not have frequent changes of key or time signatures. Milhaud wrote of this movement, "I know of no other music that touches me so intimately, so completely." In the 1950s Poulenc commented, "The 'Adagietto' must be played without romantic pathos. In this ballet nobody falls in love for life, they have sex! Let's just leave it there." The initial mood of wistful charm – "doucement mélancolique" according to the score – is briefly interrupted by a louder and more emphatic section for a few bars, before the music becomes calm again, leading to a quiet close.

=== Jeu ===
"Jeu": text and translation
Key:
- Men's voices: plain text
- Women's voices: italic text
- Both: bold text

J'ai quatre filles à marier.
J'en ai rempli tout mon grenier.
Grands dieux! Je ne sais comment
marier tous ces enfants.
Ah! J'aimerai qui m'aime,
j'aimerai qui m'aimera.
Ma fille, je parle à vous,
ma fille, m'entendez vous?
Mon père, que dites vous?
Je dis que si vous êtes sage
vous ferez un beau mariage.
La belle, m'entendez vous?
Oï, Oï, Oï, Oï.
Puis parcourant toute la dans'
Faites trois fois la révérenc'
Et vous aurez de beaux atours,
si du rond vous faites le tour.
et vous embrasserez
celui que vous voudrez,
et vous embrasserez celui que vous aimez.
Vive le mois de mai!
Vive le joli mai!
Vive le mai, le mai joli!
Vive le joli mois de mai!
Ah! Ah! Ah! Ah!
Vive le vin et le tabac!
C'est le brun que j'aime
et qui m'aura, c'est lui que je choisirai.
La belle, est-ce vrai
que vous m'aimez, est-ce moi
que vous prendrez?
Ma fille, il vous faut
vous marier: choisissez qui vous aimez.
Ah! Ah! Ah! Ah!
Vive le joli mois de mai!
Vive le mois, le mois d'amour!
Mad'moiselle, entrez chez nous
Mad'moiselle, entrez un coup
afin que l'on vous aime le cœur
tout plein d'amour.
Un mari choisirez vous;
choisissez donc un bon coup.
Faites moi les yeux doux;
embrassez moi dans le cou
Mettez vous à genoux,
et puis relevez vous.

Me voici à genoux,
tout plein d'amour pour vous.
Revenez parmi nous,
revenez encore un coup.
Mon bien aimé voyez
combien mes baisirs sont doux.
Ah, que vos yeux sont beaux,
et que votre sein est rond!
Si c'est le brun que
vous avez choisi.
Ma chérie, si vous m'aimez
il faut encore m'embrasser.
Ma fille, il faut l'épouser
et cela sans plus tarder.
J'ai quatre filles à marier.
J'en ai rempli tout mon grenier.

I have four daughters to marry.
I have filled my whole loft.
Great gods! I do not know how
to marry all these children.
Ah! I will love whoever loves me,
I will love whoever will love me.
My daughter, I'm talking to you,
my daughter, do you hear me?
My father, what do you say?
I say that if you are wise
you will make a beautiful marriage.
Beautiful one, do you hear me?
Oi, Oi, Oi, Oi.
Then in going through the dance
Make three times a reverence
And you will have beautiful clothes,
if you go round the circle.
and you will embrace
whoever you want,
and you will kiss the one you love.
Long live the month of May!
Long live the pretty may!
Long live May, pretty May!
Long live the beautiful month of May!
Ah! Ah! Ah! Ah!
Long live wine and tobacco!
It's the dark one that I like
and I'll choose whoever will have me.
Pretty one, is it true
that you love me, is it me
that will you take?
My daughter, you need
to get married: choose who you like.
Ah! Ah! Ah! Ah!
Long live the beautiful month of May!
Long live the month, the month of love!
Mad'moiselle, enter our house
Mad'moiselle, give a glance
so that we love you with a heart
all full of love.
A husband will choose you;
so choose a good catch.
Look at me sweetly;
Kiss me on the neck
Get on your knees,
and then rise up.
Here I am on my knees,
all full of love for you.
Come back among us
come back again.
My beloved, see
how sweet are my kisses.
Oh, how beautiful your eyes are,
and how rounded your breast!
If it's the dark one
you have chosen.
My darling, if you love me
kiss me again.
My daughter, you have to marry
and that without further delay.
I have four daughters to marry.
I have filled my whole loft.

This is the first of the two choral movements for female and male voices. The words are those of a father hoping to marry off his four daughters, and the questions the daughters ask him about picking a husband. The movement is marked "presto", and switches throughout between 5/4, 4/4, 3/4 and 2/4 time.

=== Rag-Mazurka ===
The movement begins "presto" in 3/8 time, switches to 6/8 and then 9/8, with a later rapid succession of time signatures, including changes from 2/4 to 4/4 to 5/4 and 6/4 within seven bars. Towards the end of the movement the perpetuum mobile halts and is replaced with a conclusion marked "très calme". Horsley comments that although the movement reflects the fashion for jazz in 1920s Paris, "most listeners will hear more of Paris here than Scott Joplin". As for the mazurka of the outer sections, it is "a long way from Chopin’s piano works of this genre". At more than six minutes' duration this is the longest section of the ballet.

=== Andantino ===
The conductor Norman Del Mar comments that despite the marking, this movement is closer to allegretto if taken at the composer's quite brisk metronome mark. The music, which refers back to the rondeau in its material, veers between what Del Mar calls "gentle ingenuousness" and "rumbustious moments". Towards the end of the movement the music becomes very loud, the brass predominating, but the closing bars, led by the woodwind are marked "très calme" before a final emphatic chord for the brass and lower strings.

=== Petite chanson dansée ===
"Petite chanson dansée": text and translation
Key:
- Men's voices: plain text
- Women's voices: italic text
- Both: bold text

J'ai un joli laurier,
un joli laurier de France.
Qui veut de mon laurier?
A qui faut-il le donner?
Je préférerais
un bouquet de giroflées,
un bouquet tout frais cueilli.
Est-ce un bouquet d'oranger?
Je n'ai qu'un beau laurier.
Je n'ai pas de giroflées.
Un bouquet de giroflées
tout couvert de rosée.
Et c'est le laurier
que le veux vous donner.
Prenez mon beau laurier.
Ah! Ah! Ah! Ah!
Ah! donnez moi un bon bouquet!
Hélas! je n'ai pas de giroflées.
Mon joli laurier
Et bien voulez vous un collier
de capucines? Un joli collier
blond que j'ai couvert de baisers?
Si vous me donnez
le bouquet que je demande,
je verrais si je peux
me marier avec vous.
C'est à la Saint Mathieu
que nous nous marierons,
si vous me donnez
le bouquet de giroflées.
Et si je vous donne un bouquet,
un bouquet de giroflées,
me promettez vous
de m'embrasser sur la joue?
Je vous donnerai
ce que vous me demandez,
puis qu'à la Saint Mathieu
nous serons mariés.
C'est à la Saint Mathieu
que nous marierons,
donnez moi des giroflées
qu'il faut se marier.
Vive le beau mai,
le mois de la giroflée!

I have a pretty laurel,
a pretty, French laurel.
Who would like my laurel?
Whom shall I give it to?
I prefer
a bouquet of wallflowers
a bouquet of freshly-cut wallflowers.
Is that orange blossom?
I have only a beautiful laurel.
I have no wallflowers.
A bouquet of wallflowers
covered in dew.
And it is the laurel
that I want to give you.
Take my beautiful laurel.
Ah! Ah! Ah! Ah!
Ah! Give me a fine bouquet!
Alas, I have no wallflowers.
My pretty laurel,
Would you like a necklace
of nasturtiums? A pretty necklace
that I have covered with kisses?
If you give me
the bouquet I ask for
I will see if I
can marry you
It is at St Matthew's
that we will be married,
if you give me
the bouquet of wallflowers.
And if I give you a bouquet
– a bouquet of wallflowers
do you promise me
you will kiss me on the cheek?
I will give you
what you ask me,
then at St Matthew's
we will be married.
It's at Saint Matthew's
that we will marry,
give me that wallflowers
for our marriage.
Long live beautiful May,
the month of the wallflower!

In the second of the two choral sections for female and male voices the men woo the women offering laurels as a present; the women insist on bouquets of wallflowers before they will accept the men. The movement is marked "moderato non troppo". As in other movements, there are several changes of time signature, but 4/4 predominates.

=== Final ===
The finale is marked presto, at minim=108, a tempo so fast that Del Mar judges it barely playable. It is, he says, "virtuoso writing and needs spectacular playing". A short section in the middle of the finale is more relaxed, but the tempo increases again and the initial theme returns at the same high speed as before to conclude the piece.

== Ballet ==
Bronislava Nijinska (1908 photograph)

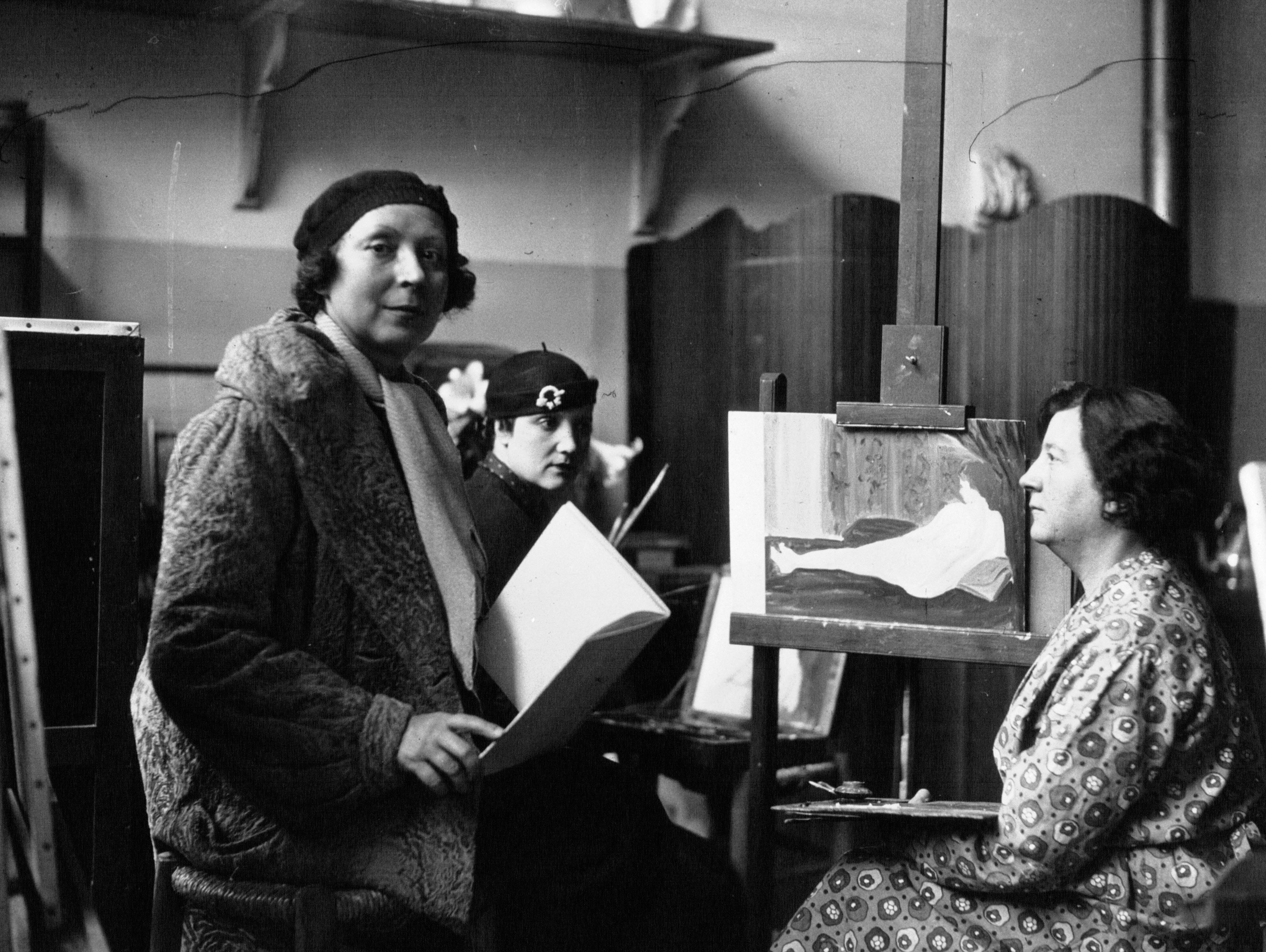
Marie Laurencin, who created the original decor and costumes

Like the music, the choreography of Les Biches is neoclassical. In an article about Les Biches written in 1930, Frederick Ashton wrote, "the whole ballet is new, and yet it is, at the same time, composed entirely of classical movement with a new expression." In The International Encyclopedia of Dance Gunhild Oberzaucher-Schüller writes that the Les Biches was influenced by the legacy of the 19th-century choreographer Marius Petipa, given a modern twist by Nijinska:

Taking the classical repertory of steps as her starting point but using an inventive port de bras, flexed arms, a new kind of pas de bourrée, variations of épaulements and pointe, and asynchronous movements of the torso and legs, she developed new possibilities for classical technique. The work was a triumph for Nijinska, who viewed it as a twentieth-century equivalent of Les Sylphides.

While Nijinska was creating the choreography, she worked out her Hostess role on Ninette de Valois, who was in the corps. Lydia Sokolova later recalled that "when we did Les Biches, and she created the hostess for herself, she improvised mostly. That was the trouble with Bronia. If she suddenly felt she wanted to pull her face this way or that way, she'd do it. She wouldn't leave it as the dance was arranged, she would put in this extra thing, or a little thing with her feet". Clement Crisp describes the ballet as a "delicious piece", noting the "cunningly different ports de bras, the freshness of use of the classical dance, the clarity of texture in the movement all make it a delight", and contends that the soundness of the choreography have contributed the lasting popularity of the work.

The preface to the published score states: "The action passes in a large, white drawing room with just one piece of furniture, an immense blue sofa. It is a warm summer afternoon and three young men are enjoying the company of sixteen lovely women. Just as in 18th-century prints, their play is innocent in appearance only." At the premiere the sofa was a magnificent piece of furniture which the Grand Théâtre de Monte Carlo borrowed from the grand casino next door. In a letter to Diaghilev Poulenc wrote "Nijinska is really a genius. Listen to this: having decided that the sofa is a 'star', just as she herself is, she is making it dance throughout the Game".

The work comprises an overture and eight successive tableaux depicting, in Moore's words, "various scenes of coquetry and seduction". The critic of Le Temps, Henry Malherbe, wrote after the ballet was first given in Paris that in this piece "atmosphere replaces action": in the absence of a plot the composer was free to present a ballet that "does not express anything precise and logical, other than a succession of characters that are pleasing to watch." His fellow critic, Raoul Brunei, described the piece as "a choreographic fantasy whose meaning is not very clear." Moore gives the last word on the plot to the English dancer Lydia Sokolova, a member of the company in the premiere: "There was no story to Les Biches – it was far too chic to have anything so obvious". Not only did the ballet have no plot: its characters were not given names, although commentators have frequently invented them. The original programme listed the scenes and participants thus:

Rondeau	Mmes Doubrovska, Devalois, Maikerska, Nikitina, Coxon, Allanova, Soumarokova, Chamié, Komaroira, Rosenstein, Soumarokova II, Zalevska
Chanson dansée	MM Léon Woizikovsky, Anatole Wilzak, Nicolas Zverew
Adagietto	Mme Vera Nemtchinova
Jeu	Mme Vera Nemtchinova; MM Anatole Wilzak, Léon Woizikovsky, Nicolas Zverew et ensemble
Rag Mazurka	La Nijinska, MM Léon Woizikovsky, Nicolas Zverew
Andantino	Mme Vera Nemtchinova, M Anatole Wilzak
Chanson dansée	Mmes Lubov Tchernicheva, Lydia Sokolova
Final	Mmes Nijinska, Vera Nemtchinova, Lubov Tchernicheva, Lydia Sokolova; MM Anatole Wilzak, Léon Woizikovsky et ensemble

Lydia Sokolova as the Hostess in a 1925 revival of Les Biches

Companies such as the Royal Ballet that have revived Nijinska's ballet have maintained the anonymity of the characters. Although not labelled in Nijinska's production, the main characters have come to be known by descriptive titles. They are:

- The Hostess, in party attire with pearl necklace and a long cigarette holder (originally danced by Nijinska).
- Three male athletes dressed for rowing or bathing.
- "La garçonne", or "the girl in blue" or "the page boy": a sexually ambiguous figure played by a ballerina dressed in a boy's costume of blue velvet, who dances a pas de deux with one of the athletes. (Note: Brinson and Crisp comment that as the role is always danced by a girl, it is called "the 'Girl in Blue', a piece of nice-mindedness that cannot disguise the fact that the character is in fact a page-boy, and the proclivities of at least one of the bathers are in no doubt at all".) The role was originally danced by Vera Nemtchinova.
- "The grey girls": two young women whose interactions suggest they are a lesbian couple.

=== Rondeau ===
The tableau is danced by the twelve female members of the corps de ballet, dressed in identical pink frocks and ostrich-feathered head-dresses. They form lines, circles, groups, and finally one long line, and at the end six dancers exit on each side of the stage.

=== Chanson dansée ===
Three athletes dressed for rowing enter, with much macho posturing. They preen themselves to impress some of the women.

=== Adagietto ===
The androgynous figure often called la garçonne performs a slow dance, largely en pointe, watched by the women and the athletes. Towards the end one of the athletes dances with la garçonne and kneels to kiss her/his hand. They exit together.

=== Jeu ===
The women mill about. The sofa is turned around and some of the women conceal themselves behind it. The garçonne and the athlete cross the stage engrossed in each other. The remaining two athletes dance and then lean against the sofa. The women emerge from hiding and pursue them.

=== Rag Mazurka ===
The Hostess, her two athletes, and the blue sofa: Bennet Gardside, Zenaida Yanowsky and Thomas Whitehead in the Royal Ballet production, 2005

The Hostess enters the empty stage and performs a virtuoso solo dance (with intricately rhythmic steps, described by the ballet critic Jan Parry as "a fiendish tongue-twister for the feet"). (Note: In the original production Nijinska danced the role in high heels, but she allowed her successors to wear ballet shoes.) The two athletes enter and preen themselves before her; she flirts openly with them and the three dance off, with the athletes in pursuit of the hostess.

=== Andantino ===
The garçonne and the first athlete dance together. They end in a tight embrace.

=== Chanson dansée ===
The girls in grey dance together. Towards the end of their dance they look at each other face on and then exit on opposite sides of the stage

=== Final ===
The finale features all the dancers, first the corps, who then dance off as the principals enter. The ballet ends with the hostess dancing with her two athletes, the first athlete with the garçonne, and the girls in grey dancing separately.

== Revivals ==
The ballet was staged in Paris by the Ballets Russes, at the Théâtre des Champs-Élysées, on 26 May 1924, just over four months after the Monte Carlo premiere. Diaghilev persuaded André Messager to conduct, greatly to the composer's pleasure as he had been disappointed by the conducting of Édouard Flament at the premiere. The cast was unchanged. As at Monte Carlo, the performance had what Hell describes as a triumphant reception. The critics were mostly enthusiastic, with the exceptions of Adolphe Boschot, who thought it a caricature, Emile Vuillermoz, who thought the music monotonous, and Olin Downes, for The New York Times, who declared the piece "pretentious and artificial" and the music "the last word in insipidity". Those who praised the work included Cocteau, Malherbe, Louis Laloy, Boris de Schlözer, and the correspondent of The Times, who judged the choreography "ingenious" and the score "full of irresistible good spirits and delicious tunes".

Diaghilev took the ballet to London in 1925. There was some speculation beforehand that the official theatre censor, the Lord Chamberlain, might ban the piece for its suggestions of unconventional sexuality, but a licence was granted to perform it, and it was given at the Coliseum, under the title The House Party. The London theatre critic of The Times was tepid about the music, the choreography and the designs, and did not mention – as the highly favourable review in The Manchester Guardian did – the enthusiasm with which the public had greeted the piece. The cast was largely the same as at the premiere, but Anton Dolin replaced Anatole Wilzak as Vera Nemtchinova's partner in the Andantino.

Wassily de Basil's Ballet Russe de Monte Carlo included Les Biches in its repertoire in the mid-1930s. Nijinska staged the work, as The House Party, for the Markova-Dolin Ballet in 1937; Alicia Markova took the part of Nemtchinova and Anton Dolin that of Anatole Wilzak, and Diana Gould was among the cast as the Hostess. In the late 1940s the Grand Ballet du Marquis de Cuevas revived the work; Nijinska, as the company's chief choreographer, supervised the revival. The company included Les Biches in its London seasons and gave the New York premiere of the piece in 1950; the company included Marjorie Tallchief as the garçonne and George Skibine as the leader of the three athletes. In The New York Times John Martin called it "one of the masterpieces of the modern ballet".

In 1964 Frederick Ashton – by this time director of the Royal Ballet and a great admirer of the choreographer – invited Nijinska to re-create the ballet at the Royal Opera House, and he took close personal interest in the rehearsals and costume fittings. Svetlana Beriosova danced Nijinska's old role of the hostess; Georgina Parkinson played the garçonne. Subsequent performers of the role of the hostess in the Royal Ballet's production have included Deanne Bergsma, Monica Mason, Marguerite Porter, Darcey Bussell and Zenaida Yanowsky; the garçonne has been danced by Vergie Derman, Viviana Durante, Mara Galeazzi and Leanne Benjamin. (Note: Two years later Ashton introduced Nijinska's other masterpiece, Les noces, into the Royal Ballet repertoire. Ashton's biographer Julie Kavanagh sees Nijinska's influence in several Ashton ballets, from the early A Tragedy of Fashion and Les Masques up to Varii Capricii.)

In France, Les Biches was taken into the repertoire of two leading companies: Ballet Theatre Français performed it in the 1980s as part of a quadruple bill of Diaghilev ballets (with L'Après Midi d'un Faune, Le Spectre de la rose and Pétrouchka). The work entered the Paris Opera Ballet repertoire in 1991.

Two new ballets have been created using Poulenc's score. In 1964 BBC television commissioned and broadcast Houseparty, choreographed by Peter Darrell, which took the original Nijinska scenario and sought to update it to reflect the mores of the mid-1960s. In 2002 Thierry Malandain rechoreographed the ballet for the Malandain Ballet, Biarritz.

The work has been less frequently staged in the US than other Diaghilev ballets. The visiting Royal Ballet company presented it in New York in 1968; in 1982, Irina Nijinska, the choreographer's daughter, staged a revival for the Oakland Ballet, and the following year that production was seen in New York, given by the Dance Theater of Harlem. That staging was notable for including the three optional choral sections, sung by a solo soprano, tenor and baritone. Les Biches was featured in the 2009 "Fall for Dance" series in New York, danced by Ballet West.

== Recordings ==
=== Video ===
The Royal Ballet production of 1964 was filmed that year, with its original cast. A performance of Nijinska's ballet given by the American Oakland Ballet company in 1984 has been published on DVD; it features Shirlee Reevie (hostess) and Erin Leedom (garçonne).

=== Audio ===
The complete ballet score, including the choral sections, was first recorded by Varèse Sarabande in 1972, with Igor Markevitch conducting the Orchestre national de l'Opéra de Monte-Carlo. It was subsequently recorded by EMI in 1981, with Georges Prêtre conducting the Philharmonia Orchestra and Ambrosian Singers. It was issued on LP, and included in the 20-disc CD set "Poulenc Integrale: Edition du 50e anniversaire 1963–2013" issued in 2013 to mark the fiftieth anniversary of the composer's death. A later recording by the Choeur de l`Orchestre de Paris and Orchestre de Paris, conducted by Semyon Bychkov, was released on the Philips label.

The suite from the ballet has been recorded several times. Poulenc strongly favoured the version by the Paris Conservatoire Orchestra, conducted by Roger Désormière at the Maison de la Mutualité in Paris in June 1951 (Decca LXT 2720). (Note: Poulenc commented in the 1950s, "If the scent of Les biches remains on that disc, with a sort of cynical freshness, it's because no one will ever conduct this work as perfectly as Désormière. He understands all the sprightliness and joyful unconcern I put into it. In Les biches it's not a question of love, but of pleasure.) The recording was reissued on CD in 2003. Later LP and CD versions of the suite have been recorded under the batons of French conductors including Louis Frémaux, Louis de Froment, Prêtre, Yan Pascal Tortelier, Stéphane Denève and Jean-Luc Tingaud, and non-French conductors including Charles Dutoit, Thierry Fischer, Anatole Fistoulari and Michael Gielen.

== Notes, references and sources ==
=== Sources ===
- Beaumont, Cyril W. (1949). Complete Book of Ballets. London: Putnam. OCLC 906471752.
- Brinson, Peter; Clement Crisp (1970). Ballet for all: A Guide to One Hundred Ballets. London: Pan Books. ISBN 9780330024303. OCLC 819676577.
- Buckle, Richard (1979). Diaghilev. London: Weidenfeld and Nicolson. ISBN 978-0-297-77506-5.
- Burt, Ramsay (2007). The Male Dancer: Bodies, Spectacle and Sexuality. London and New York: Routledge, Taylor & Francis. ISBN 978-0-415-97575-9.
- Cocteau, Jean (1951). Oeuvres complètes de Jean Cocteau (in French). Geneva: Marguerat. OCLC 5925903.
- Del Mar, Norman (1998). Conducting Favourite Concert Pieces. Oxford: Clarendon Press. ISBN 978-0-19-816553-8.
- Drummond, John (1997). Speaking of Diaghilev. London and Boston: Faber. ISBN 978-0-571-17864-3.
- Hell, Henri; Edward Lockspeiser (trans) (1959). Francis Poulenc. New York: Grove Press. OCLC 1268174.
- Kavanagh, Julie (1996). Secret Muses: The Life of Frederick Ashton. London: Faber & Faber Ltd. ISBN 0-571-14352-0.
- Moore, Christopher (2012). "Camp in Francis Poulenc's Early Ballets". The Musical Quarterly. 95 (2/3): 299–342. doi:10.1093/musqtl/gds023. JSTOR 41811629. (subscription required)
- Poulenc, Francis (1924). Les biches complete ballet: vocal score. Paris: Heugel. OCLC 976572560.
- Poulenc, Francis (1948). Les biches: suite d'orchestre. Paris: Heugel. OCLC 435921801.
- Poulenc, Francis (2016). Francis Poulenc: Articles and Interviews: Notes from the Heart. Nicolas Southon (ed); Roger Nichols (trans). London and New York: Routledge. ISBN 978-1-4094-6622-2.
- Schmidt, Carl B (2001). Entrancing Muse: A Documented Biography of Francis Poulenc. Hillsdale, US: Pendragon Press. ISBN 978-1-57647-026-8.
- Vaughan, David (1999). Frederick Ashton and his Ballets (second ed.). London: Dance Books. ISBN 1852730625.
