= Mikhail Mordkin =

Russian ballet dancer

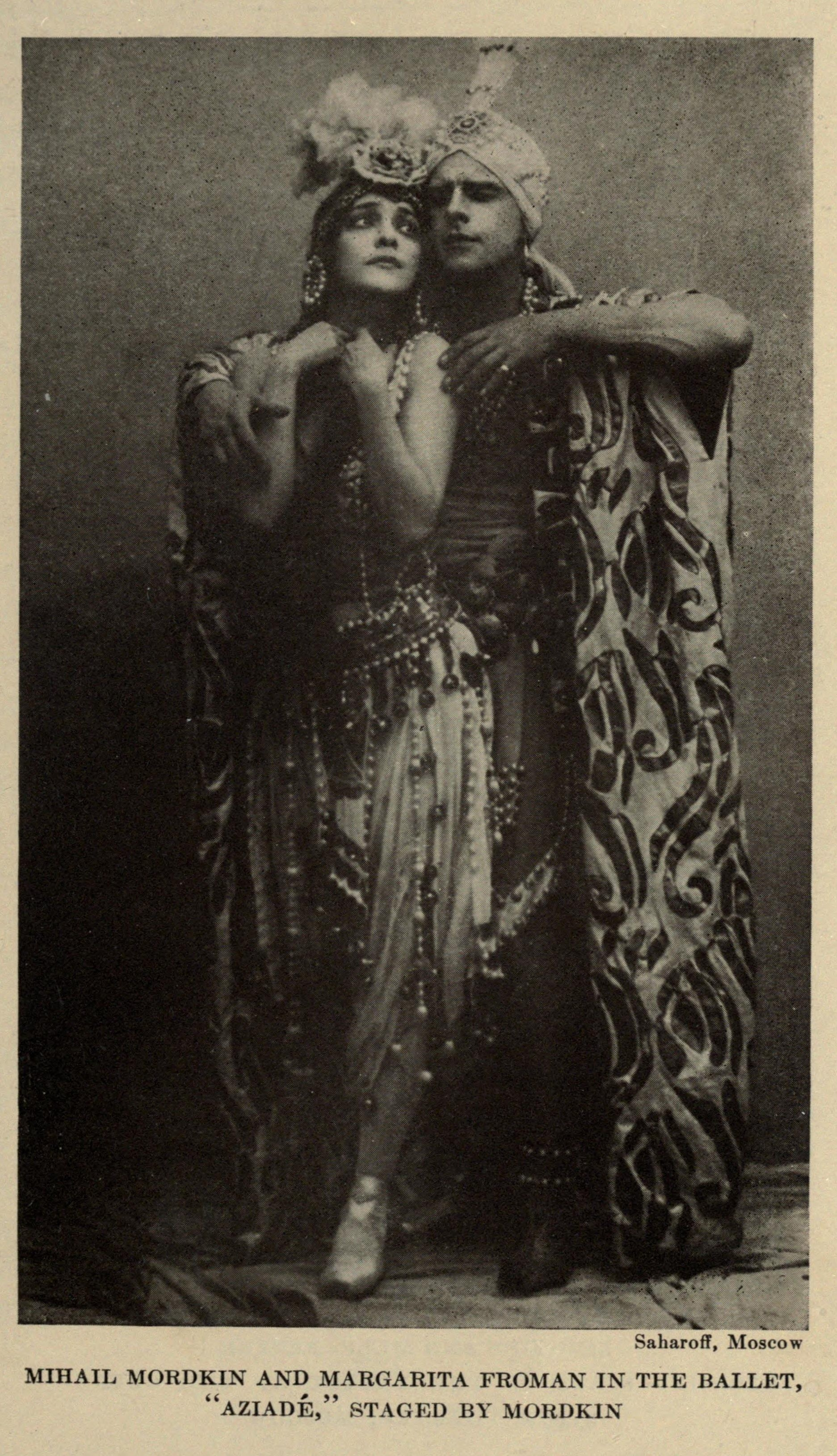
- Mordkin with Margarita Froman
- Born: Mikhail Mikhailovich Mordkin; 9 December 1880; Moscow, Russian Empire
- Died: 15 July 1944 (aged 63); Millbrook, New York, U.S.
- Education: Imperial Ballet School (Moscow)
- Occupations: Ballet dancer; choreographer; ballet master
- Organizations: Bolshoi Ballet; Ballets Russes; American Ballet Theatre

Mikhail Mordkin (Russian: Михаи́л Миха́йлович Мо́рдкин; December 9, 1880, Moscow, Russian Empire – July 15, 1944, New York) graduated from the Bolshoi Ballet School in 1899, and in the same year was appointed ballet master.

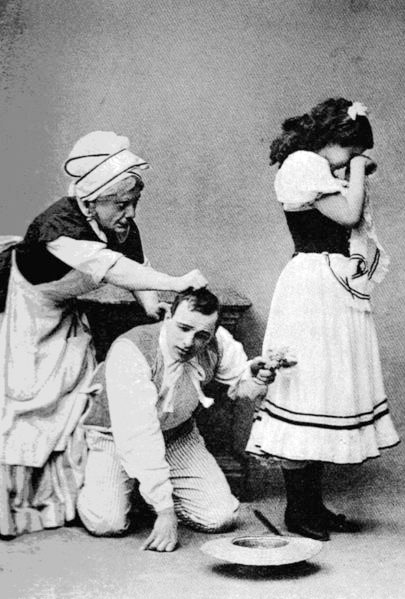
Vladimir Riabtsev as the mother, Mikhail Mordkin as Colas & Sofia Fedorova as Lise; La Fille mal gardée of Alexander Gorsky, Bolshoi Theatre, Moscow.

He joined Diaghilev's ballet in 1909 as a leading dancer. After the first season he remained in Paris to dance with Anna Pavlova. He then formed his own company, the All Star Imperial Russian Ballet, which toured America in 1911 and 1912.

Mikhail returned to the Bolshoi and was appointed its director in 1917. He left Russia after the October Revolution, first working in Lithuania, and finally settling in the United States in 1924. He founded the Mordkin Ballet in 1926, for which he choreographed a complete Swan Lake and many other ballets. His company included such distinguished artists as Hilda Butsova, Felia Doubrovska, Pierre Vladimiroff, Vera Nemtchinova and Nicholas Zvereff. After a European tour the company disbanded in 1926.

Mordkin continued to be a freelance artist and teacher, including at the Cornish School in the 1920s. From among his students in America he formed a new Mordkin Ballet in 1937. Although he had been pushed into the background, Mordkin helped build the foundation for ballet in America including through the Mordkin Moser Conservatory whose alumni included Donald Heywood.

Mikhail Mordkin died July 15, 1944 in Millbrook, New York.

== Cultural depictions ==
- Anna Pavlova, film by Emil Loteanu; portrayed by Grigore Grigoriu (1983).

== See also ==
- List of Russian ballet dancers
