= Vera Nemtchinova =

Russian ballet dancer

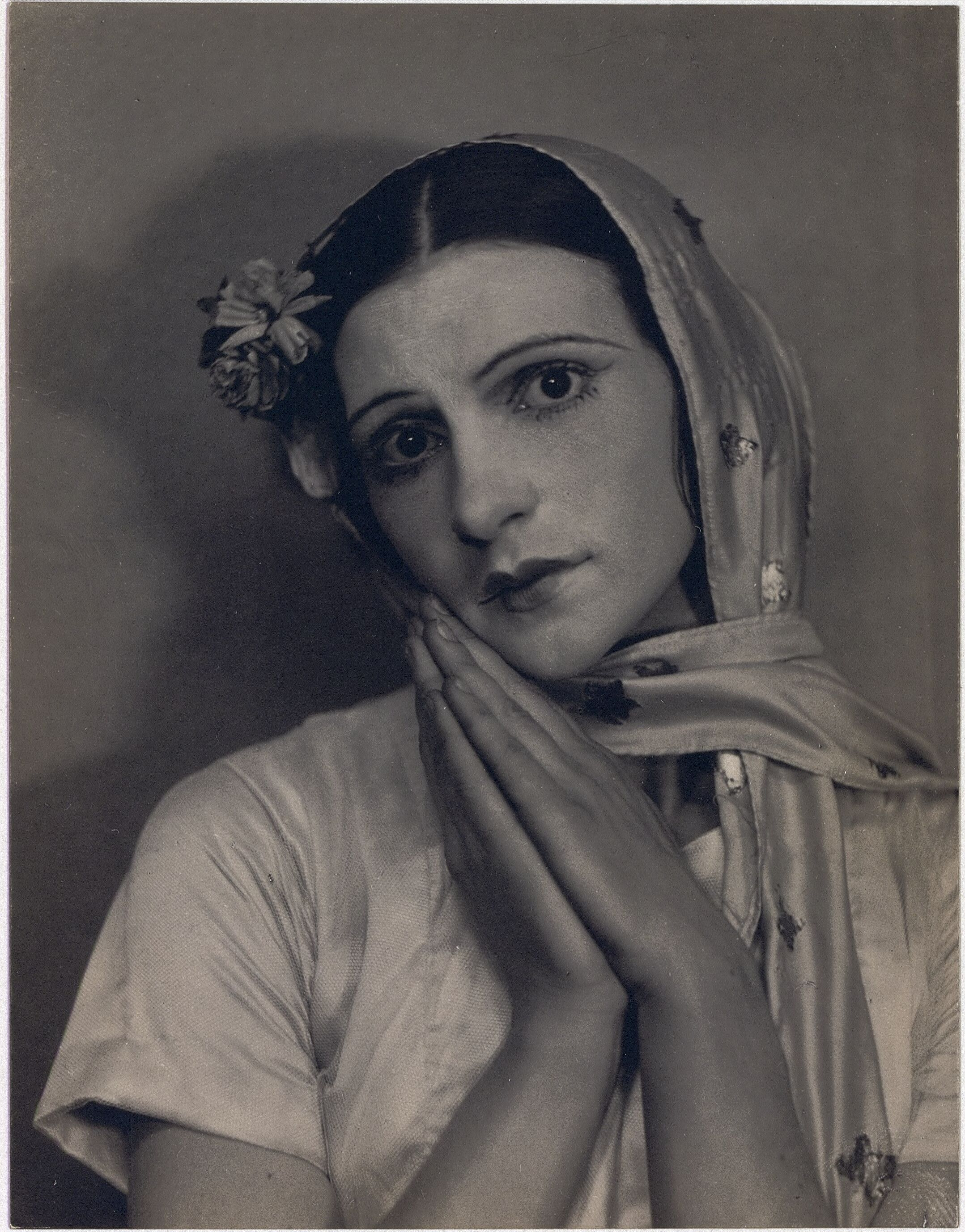
Vera Nemchinova, Les Matelots

Vera Nemtchinova (10 September 1900 – 28 June 1984) was a Russian ballet dancer.

== Biography ==
She was born in Moscow, and studied with Lydia Nelidova of the Bolshoi Ballet. She joined Sergei Diaghilev's Ballets Russes in 1915. There, she created the role of the androgynous "garçonne" in Bronislava Nijinska's 1924 ballet Les Biches, and leading roles in other modern works. After leaving the Ballets Russes in 1927 she set up her own company, with Anton Dolin, engaging George Balanchine and others as choreographers.

After she retired from dancing Nemtchinova settled in New York in 1947, where she established a studio as a ballet teacher. She was twice married, both times to dancers: first Nicolas Sverev (with whom she had danced in the Diaghilev company) and then Anatole Oboukhov, of the Mariinsky Ballet company. She died in New York, at the age of 84.

== See also ==
- List of Russian ballet dancers
