= Lydia Sokolova =

English ballerina

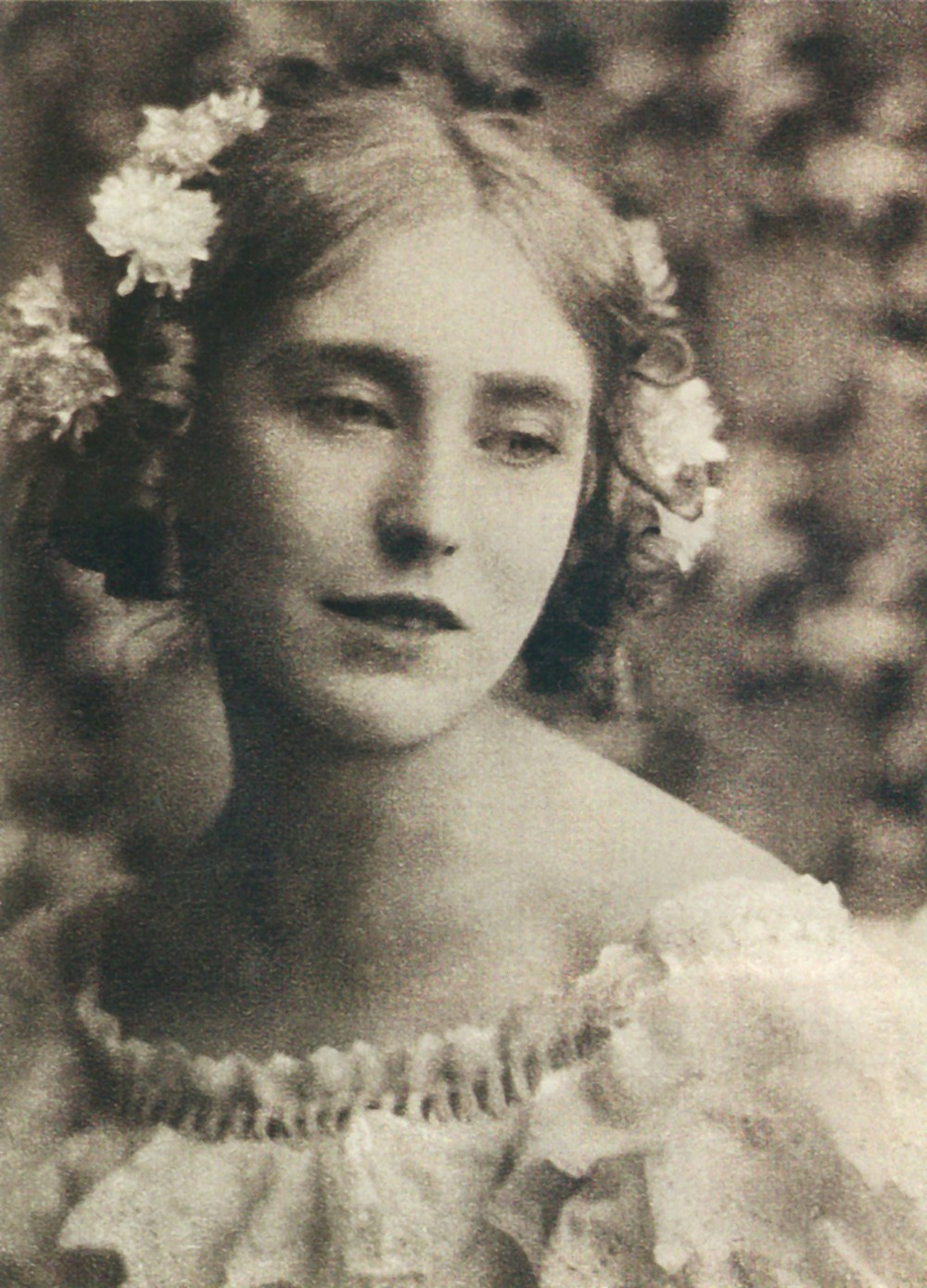
- Sokolova in 1914
- Born: Hilda Tansley Munnings; 1896; Wanstead, Essex, England
- Died: 2 February 1974 (aged 77–78); Sevenoaks, Kent, England
- Occupation: Dancer
- Years active: 1910-1962
- Spouse(s): Nikolai Kremnev, Leon Woizikovsky, Ronnie Mahon
- Children: 1
- Career
- Former groups: Ballets Russes

Lydia Sokolova (1896–1974) was an English ballerina. She trained at the Stedman Ballet Academy and learned from accomplished dancers including Anna Pavlova and Enrico Cecchetti, and was a prominent member of Sergei Diaghilev's Ballets Russes from 1913 to 1929. After the disbandment of that company, she taught, choreographed and occasionally danced. Her last stage performances were in 1962 at the Royal Opera House, London.

== Life and career ==
Born in Wanstead, Essex as Hilda Tansley Munnings, the daughter of Frederick Tansley Munnings and the widowed Emma Catherine Gaulton (née Such). She trained at Stedman's Academy and with Mikhail Mordkin, Anna Pavlova, Alexander Shiriaev, Ivan Clustine and Enrico Cecchetti. She made her professional stage debut in the corps de ballet of Alice in Wonderland at the Savoy Theatre, London, in 1910. She joined Mikhail Mordkin's All-Star Imperial Russian Ballet for a United States tour in 1911 and 1912, and Theodore Koslov's company for a London engagement and tour of Germany and Austria-Hungary in 1912 and 1913. At first she adopted the stage name Muningsova.

She joined Sergei Diaghilev's Ballets Russes in 1913. She has sometimes been described as the first English ballerina in Diaghilev's company, but Hilda Bewicke preceded her. Renamed Sokolova by Diaghilev, she was the principal character dancer of the company until it disbanded in 1929 on his death.

As the Hostess in Les biches, 1925

Sokolova danced with Vaslav Nijinsky in Le Spectre de la rose but her most famous role was the Chosen Maiden in Léonide Massine's reworking of The Rite of Spring (1920). She won approbation for "what is generally agreed to be the longest and most exhausting solo in the history of theatrical dance". Other notable performances include La Boutique fantasque (1919), The Three-Cornered Hat (1919), Les matelots (1925) and Le Bal (1929). In Bronislava Nijinska's Les biches (1924) she was one of the original pair of Grey Girls, and was quickly promoted to dance the central role of the Hostess.

After the Ballets Russes disbanded, Sokolova returned to England to teach, coach, work on choreography and occasionally perform. Her last performance was in 1962 when she danced at the Royal Opera House, London with the Royal Ballet, as the Marquise Silvestra in Massine's revival of his The Good-humoured Ladies, with Antoinette Sibley in Sokolova's old role of Mariuccia.

In 1945 Henry Gibbs dedicated to Sokolova his book Affectionately Yours Fanny: Fanny Kemble and the Theatre; she had helped him trace "authoritative material". In collaboration with Richard Buckle, she wrote an autobiographical work on her years with the Ballets Russes, Dancing for Diaghilev (John Murray, London, 1960).

Sokolova had one daughter, Natasha Kremnev (1917–1968), by her first husband Nikolai Kremnev (married 1917). She subsequently married Leon Woizikovsky, a long-time dancer at Ballets Russes. When she died on 2 February 1974, in Sevenoaks, Kent, England, she was survived by her third husband Ronnie Mahon.

== Sources ==
- Buckle, Richard ed. (1960) Dancing for Diaghilev: The Memoirs of Lydia Sokolova, London, John Murray.
- Gibbs, Henry. (1954) Affectionately Yours Fanny: Fanny Kemble and the Theatre, London, Jarrolds.
- Robert, Grace (2005). The Borzoi Book of Ballets. Kessinger Publishing, ISBN 1-4191-2201-0.
