= Nicolas Zverev =

Nicolas Zverev (or Zvereff; Russian: Николай Матвеевич Зверев; 1888 – 24 July 1965) was a Russian-French dancer and ballet master.

He was born in Moscow. He studied at the Moscow ballet class at the theatre school of the Moscow Imperial troupe. In 1912 he was invited by Sergei Diaghilev to his troupe Ballets russes. Zverev participated in the Ballets russes from 1912 or 1913 to 1926. Among his roles were Slave (Scheherazade, Michel Fokine's ballet), Cossack Chief (La Boutique fantasque, 1919), one of the men (Les biches, 1924) etc.

After the Russian Revolution of 1917, Zverev could not return to Russia. He continued to work in European theaters: he worked for six years at the national Opera of Lithuania in Kaunas and was involved in the birth of the Les Ballets de Monte Carlo of René Blum (1936-1938). From 1942 to 1945, he became the master of ballet there. Between 1951 and 1953, he taught at the Conservatoire russe de Paris Serge-Rachmaninoff (together with Serge Lifar),and in 1953 he worked in the Theatre de la Monnaie in Brussels, where he reorganized the group and staged ballets of La Vie parisienne by Jacques Offenbach. From 1957 to 1960, he was the master of ballet of the Teatro Colon in Buenos Aires, and then returned to France, where he died at age 77 in Saint-Raphaël.
