= Le Tricorne =

Painted stage curtain by Pablo Picasso

Le Tricorne is a painted stage curtain created in 1919 by the Spanish artist Pablo Picasso. It was made for the Ballets Russes homonymous production, with choreography by Léonide Massine to music by Manuel de Falla, and depicts figures overlooking a bullring and sizes about 19 by 20 feet (35,3 square meters). In 1957 the artcraft was purchased from an independent dealer for US$50,000 by Phyllis Lambert, the daughter of Samuel Bronfman, the founder and chairman of the Seagram Company Ltd. (now Vivendi).

From the 1959 opening of the Four Seasons Restaurant within the Seagram Building in Midtown Manhattan, the curtain hung in "Picasso Alley" – the hallway between two dining rooms of the restaurant – and it would remain there until 2014.

In 1979 the Seagram Building was sold to the Teachers Insurance and Annuity Association of America (TIAA). But the iconic bronze and topaz glass skyscraper remained Seagram's headquarters until 2001. In 2000, TIAA sold the building to Aby Rosen's RFR Holding LLC, which has continued to operate the structure.

In 2000 Seagram's assets (including Le Tricorne) were sold to French conglomerate Vivendi. In 2005 Vivendi gifted the stage curtain to the non-profit preservationist group New York Landmarks Conservancy, as a "Gift to the City", and it remained on display at the Four Seasons.

In 2014 the Seagram Building's landlord, Aby Rosen, decided to take Le Tricorne down to repair the wall behind it. According to Rosen, the wall had been damaged by moisture and steam from the kitchens on the other side; without repairs, the painting itself was in risk. But its owner, New York Landmarks Conservancy, contended that the wall was fine, and moving the unframed painted curtain could severely damage it. The removal of the fragile, large-scale tapestry led to a legal battle between Rosen – who had reportedly described the work as a schmatte, the Yiddish word for "rag" – and Landmarks Conservancy.

Finally, after the controversial expulsion from its former home of 55 years, Le Tricorne was received as a gift by the New-York Historical Society, where it remains as of 2023.
