= Diaghilev Contemporary Art Museum =

Russian museum of contemporary art

- Музей современных искусств им.С.П.Дягилева СПбГУ
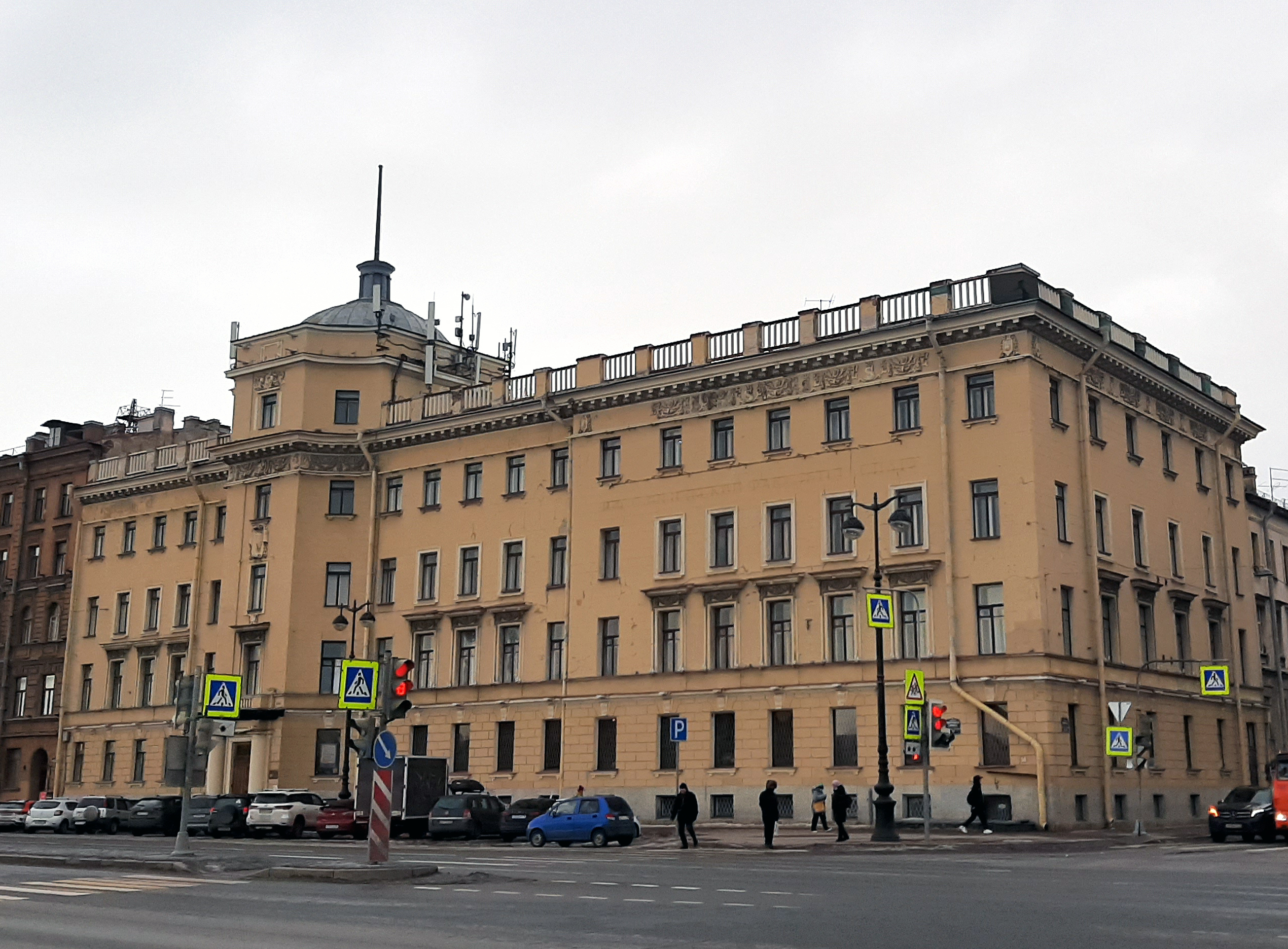
- Established: 2008
- Location: Saint Petersburg, Russia
- Type: Contemporary art
- Founder: Tatiana Yurieva
- Director: Ekaterina Staniukovich-Denisova
- Website: diaghilevmuseum.spbu.ru/en

The Diaghilev Contemporary Art Museum (Russian: Музей современных искусств им. С.П. Дягилева СПбГУ) is a state museum of contemporary Russian art located at St. Petersburg and affiliated with St. Petersburg State University.

== History ==
The museum was established in 2008 as one of the departments of St. Petersburg State University and on the basis of the collection of the Diaghilev Art Centre (1990-2008). The founder and the first director of the museum was Yurieva Tatiana, SPBU professor of Art history, art critic and americanist, one of the creators of the Diaghilev Art Centre

== Collection ==
The collection of the museum contains more than 300 items and includes paintings, sculptures, graphics and artworks in other media. The core of the collection is formed by the works of Leningrad independent artists of 1960-1980s, such as Alexandr Baturin, Anatoly Basin, Vladimir Ovchinnikov, Anatoly Vasiliev, Gleb Bogomolov, Anatoly Belkin, Alek Rapoport, Georgy Kovenchuk, Nikolai Timkov, Yevgeny Ukhnalyov, Vyacheslav Mikhaylov, Valery Lukka, Levon Lazarev.
