= North Carolina School of the Arts Summer Performance Festival =

Festivals held on the Outer Banks of North Carolina

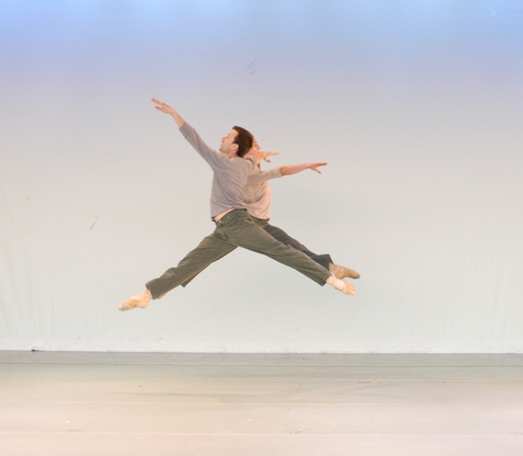
Jonathan Stiles in Heather Malloy's Le Suil Go performed at the Festival

Presenting over sixty free shows annually on the Outer Banks of North Carolina, the North Carolina School of the Arts Summer Performance Festival, funded by the State of North Carolina, is produced, performed and directed by students, alumni, faculty and staff of the University of North Carolina School of the Arts (UNCSA). The family-friendly festival offers drama, music, dance and film performances for six consecutive weeks, late June to early August, at Roanoke Island Festival Park in Manteo, North Carolina. Since its inception in 1997, the summer festival has become an important cultural resource to residents and visitors of North Carolina and an enriching educational and training experience for emerging and professional artists of UNCSA. In 2007, the festival audience grew to a record attendance of over 11,000.

Evening festival events are staged at the newly renovated Outdoor Pavilion on the banks of Shallowbag Bay while afternoon events are staged indoors at the Film Theater. Both venues are at Roanoke Island Festival Park just across the bridge from the seaside town of Manteo. As of 2005, the festival's rain policy changed. In inclement weather, all outdoor shows now move to the Film Theater replacing the previous cancellation policy.

For evening shows, patrons are encouraged to bring blankets and chairs as no permanent seats are available on the lawn. Many families and groups come early to enjoy a picnic at the park before the shows. All shows are free and appropriate for all ages. Casual attire is encouraged. Even pets and pajamas are welcome.

== Performance series ==
In recent years, the festival has expanded its calendar of events to include additional programs for families. In 2006, UNCSA's School of Drama produced its first family musical, You're a Good Man, Charlie Brown and a new Saturday Night at the Movies series. First produced in 2007, the Rock the Boat! series invites families to relax on the charming Manteo waterfront while UNCSA's conservatory-trained musicians perform aboard the Elizabeth II. In 2008, a newly created Classics for Kids series presents an hour of kid-focused music every Thursday afternoon and gives children an opportunity to interact with the musicians and their instruments. In addition, the films on Saturday nights move from the Film Theater to the big outdoor screen.

=== Outdoor Pavilion Series ===
Feature presentations vary each summer. Shows are at 8 pm at the Outdoor Pavilion for four consecutive nights, Tuesday through Friday. Traditionally, each week of the season presents a different program presented by the Schools of Drama, Music, Dance or Film. In recent years the UNCSA School of Drama has expanded its presentations to include a Shakespeare comedy, a family musical and a cabaret performed in repertoire during three weeks of the festival. The School of Music presentations may include concerts by the UNCSA orchestra or by UNCSA ensembles for jazz, ragtime, percussion, woodwinds or brass. The School of Dance presents a program of classical and contemporary dance often featuring new and juried works by UNCSA alumni. The School of Filmmaking presents films on Saturday nights selected for a family audience. All shows are designed and produced by the faculty and students from UNCSA's School of Design and Production.

=== Afternoon Classics Series ===
Casual classical concerts are offered on Tuesday and Friday afternoons at 2 pm in the Film Theater. Programs vary daily and weekly. Music for guitars, saxophones, vocalists, woodwinds, strings, brass, or percussion may be featured with repertoire ranging from jazz to classical by American and international composers.

=== Wild Wednesday! Series ===
Excerpts from the 8 pm feature performances may be heard every Wednesday at 2 pm in the Film Theater. Audiences are encouraged to meet the performers and ask questions about life as a student at UNCSA.

=== Rock the Boat! Series ===
On Wednesdays at 7 pm, musicians aboard the Elizabeth II perform a 30-minute concert to boaters, pedestrians and diners on the [Manteo] waterfront.

=== Classics for Kids Series ===
On Thursdays at 2 pm, musicians present programs designed especially for kids in the Film Theater. Kids are invited to participate and interact with the performers.

=== Saturday Night at the Movies Film Series ===
The School of Filmmaking selects films for a family audience ranging from classic Charlie Chaplin films to contemporary animation. Films are shown at 8 pm on the big outdoor screen at Roanoke Island Festival Park's Outdoor Pavilion.

== Fourth of July celebration ==
Now an Outer Banks tradition, Roanoke Island Festival Park, the Town of Manteo and UNCSA honors America's independence with an evening of patriotic music and dazzling fireworks. Music begins at 8 pm and continues during the fireworks beginning at dark. Families and groups are encouraged to come early to picnic at the park.

== CAP for kids ==
Introduced in 2007, the festival offers a program to encourage young patrons to attend shows for performing artists. Kids can become a Community Arts Patron or CAP by attending at three least shows. CAP punch cards are available at each performance and may be redeemed for prizes when children present their CAP card at their third show.

== Festival alumni ==
Festival performers often make headlines soon after they perform in Manteo. In addition to playing in orchestras and on stages worldwide, recent alumni have won the Metropolitan Opera's National Finalist award, performed on Broadway, played in the Grammy orchestra, acted in films and TV series and joined professional dance companies like Limon, Pilobolus, and American Ballet Theatre.
