= Alceo Galliera =

Italian conductor and composer

- Alceo Galliera (photo with 1955 dedication)
- Occupation: conductor

Alceo Galliera (3 May 1910 – 21 April 1996) was a distinguished Italian conductor and composer. He was the son of Arnaldo Galliera (1871—1934) who taught in organ class at the Parma Conservatory.

Galliera was born in Milan in 1910 and studied piano, organ, and composition at the Milan Conservatory.

Among the orchestras he conducted were those of La Scala and the Santa Cecilia Academy in Rome. He conducted operas in which Maria Callas sang, as well as concerts with such great pianists as Claudio Arrau, Arturo Benedetti Michelangeli and Dinu Lipatti. He also appeared at the Lucerne Festival where he conducted the Philharmonia Orchestra, and the Salzburg Festival with the Vienna Philharmonic. In 1950-51 he was the conductor of the Melbourne Symphony Orchestra (then known as the Victorian Symphony Orchestra).

His compositions include 'Scherzo-Tarantella' and 'The Wise Virgins and the Foolish Virgins'.
