= Le Baiser de la fée (disambiguation) =

Le Baiser de la fée (The Fairy's Kiss) is a 1928 ballet by Igor Stravinsky.

Le Baiser de la fée can also refer to:

- Le Baiser de la fée, a 1928 choreography by Bronislava Nijinska of Stravinsky's ballet of the same name
- Le Baiser de la fée, a 1935 choreography by Sir Frederick Ashton of Stravinsky's ballet of the same name
- Le Baiser de la fée, a 1950 revision by George Balanchine of Stravinsky's ballet of the same name
- Le Baiser de la fée, a 1960 choreography by Sir Kenneth MacMillan of Stravinsky's ballet of the same name
