= Sergei Diaghilev =

Russian art critic and impresario (1872–1929)

- Сергей Дягилев
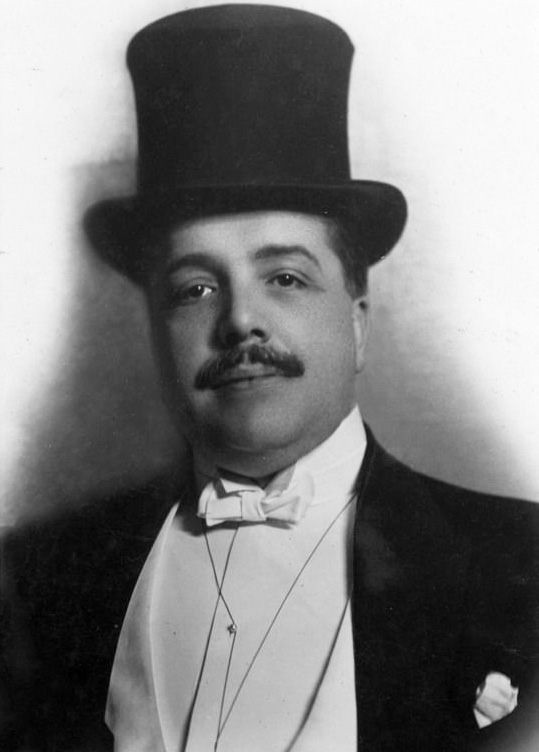
- Diaghilev in 1910
- Born: Sergei Pavlovich Diaghilev; 31 March 1872; Selishchi, Novgorod Governorate, Russian Empire
- Died: 19 August 1929 (aged 57); Venice, Italy
- Resting place: Isola di San Michele, near Venice
- Occupations: Art critic, patron and ballet impresario
- Known for: Founder of the Ballets Russes
- Relatives: Dmitry Filosofov (cousin); Anna Filosofova (aunt)

Sergei Pavlovich Diaghilev (Note: In this name that follows East Slavic naming customs, the patronymic is Pavlovich and the family name is Diaghilev.) (/diˈæɡɪlɛf/ dee-AG-il-ef; Russian: Серге́й Па́влович Дя́гилев, IPA: [sʲɪrˈɡʲej ˈpavləvʲɪdʑ ˈdʲæɡʲɪlʲɪf]; (Note: In isolation, Pavlovich is pronounced [ˈpavləvʲɪtɕ].) 31 March [O.S. 19 March] 1872 – 19 August 1929), also known as Serge Diaghilev, was a Russian art critic, patron, ballet impresario and founder of the Ballets Russes, from which many famous dancers and choreographers would arise.

Diaghilev's career can be divided into two periods: in Saint Petersburg (1898–1906) and while as an emigrant (1906–1929).

== Biography ==
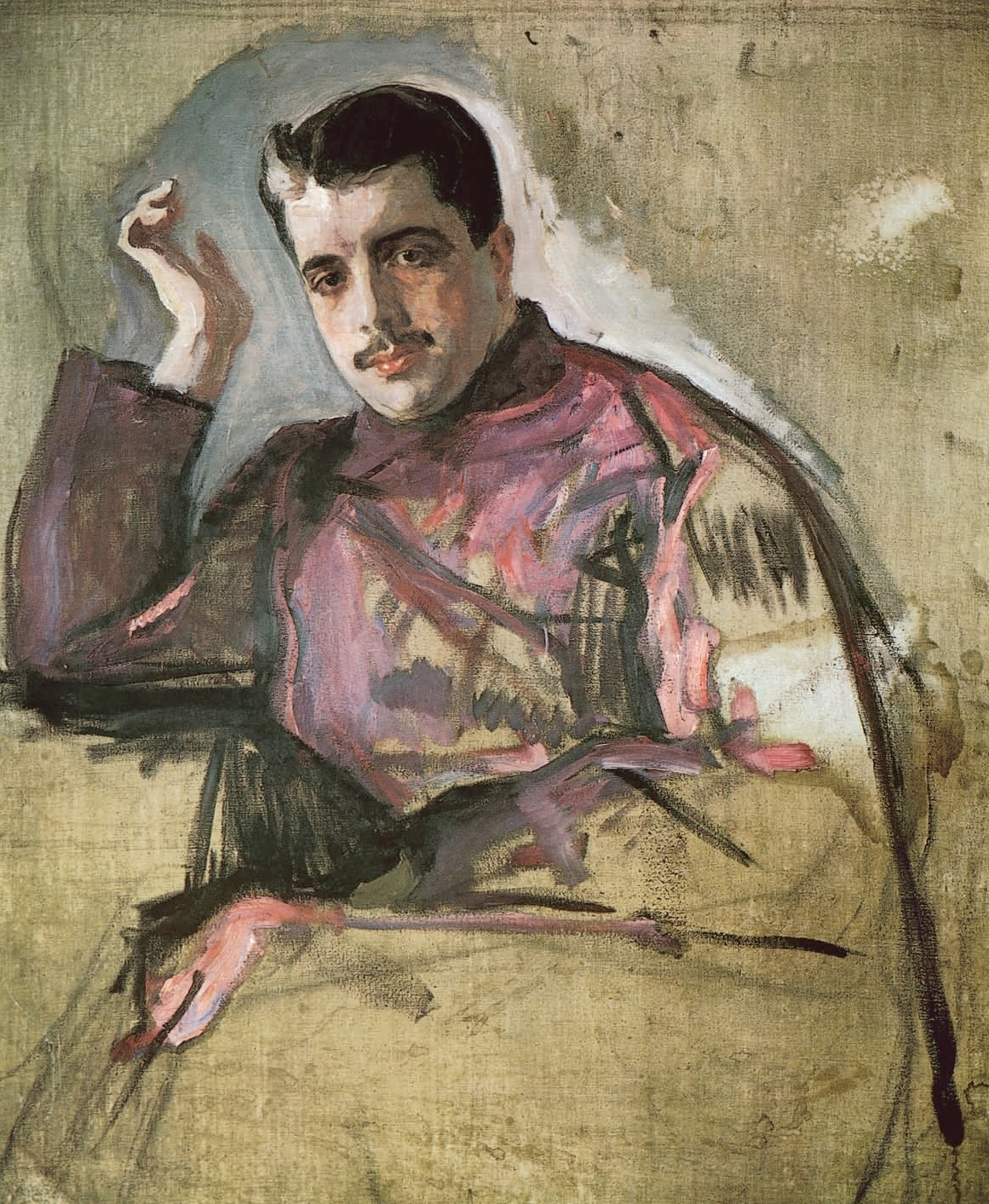
Sergei Diaghilev by Valentin Serov, 1904

Sergei Diaghilev was born in Selishchi to a noble officer Pavel Diaghilev. His mother died from childbed fever soon after his birth. In 1873, Pavel met and married Elena Panaeva, who loved Sergei and raised him as her own child. The House of Diaghilev in Perm was a local cultural centre, and the Diaghilevs hosted a musical evening every second Thursday, Modest Mussorgsky being one of the most frequent guests. Sergei Diaghilev composed his first romance at the age of 15. When he entered the Saint Petersburg Imperial University, he also had private music lessons with Nikolai Rimsky-Korsakov. Instead of the usual four, it took him six years to graduate. By his own admission, Diaghilev used his student years 'to look around' and find his true interests in life. Seven months after graduation he opened his first exhibition.

=== Life in Saint Petersburg ===
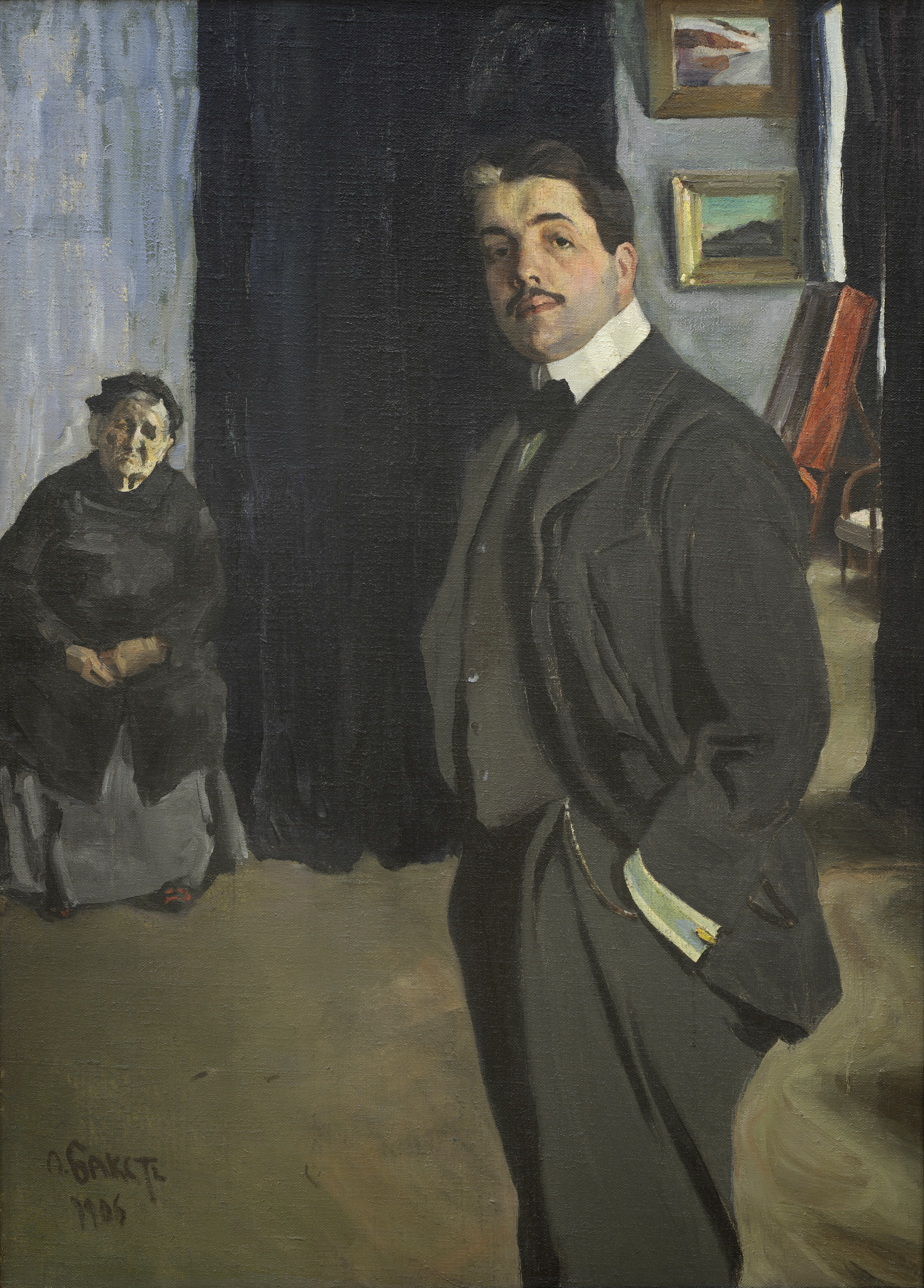
Sergei Diaghilev with his nanny, 1905, Léon Bakst

During his years at University, Diaghilev's cousin Dmitry Filosofov introduced him to a circle of art-loving friends who called themselves The Nevsky Pickwickians. They included Alexandre Benois, Walter Nouvel, Konstantin Somov, and Léon Bakst. Although not instantly received into the group, Diaghilev was aided by Benois in developing his knowledge of Russian and Western art. In two years, he had voraciously absorbed this new obsession (even travelling abroad to further his studies) and came to be respected as one of the most learned of the group.

In the late 1890s, Diaghilev created several art exhibitions that were intended to introduce the contemporary artists to the local public and, later, to the Europeans. The exposition of British and German watercolorists in 1897 at the Imperial Society for the Encouragement of the Arts became a huge success—one which Diaghilev repeated in 1898 with the exhibition of the Russian and Finnish artists at the Stieglitz Academy with the works of those such as Mikhail Vrubel, Valentin Serov, and Isaac Levitan. In the same year he opened an exhibition of young Russian painters in Germany. Though the young art connoisseur had no private fortune, he managed to gain the protection and support of such high nobility as the Grand Duke Vladimir Alexandrovich and later even Nicholas II.

The Russian-Finnish exhibition of 1898 became the first action of the recently formed society ‘Mir iskusstva’, established by Benois and Diaghilev earlier that year. The group also included Konstantin Somov, Dmitry Filosofov, Léon Bakst, and Eugene Lansere. Soon, with the help of Savva Mamontov (the director of the Russian Private Opera Company) and Princess Maria Tenisheva, the group founded the journal Mir iskusstva (World of Art). The magazine was intended to serve 'the god Apollo' and promote modern art. The first issue was released in February 1898. As recalled by Benois, Diaghilev, as the art director, created the style and designed the publication, wrote critical essays, and, in 1904, published a monograph on Dmitry Levitzky. Nevertheless, Benois remembered him as the member of Mir iskusstva least interested in philosophy and literature, frequently revealing huge gaps in his knowledge of the classics.

On 6 March 1905, he opened an exhibition of the ‘Russian portraits of the 18th and 19th centuries' at the Tauride Palace with more than 4000 paintings collected from 450 owners. Diaghilev himself travelled to acquire the portraits and wrote a catalogue of 2300 art works with information on the artists, models, and other relevant data. The exposition, designed by Benois, was an innovative example of art synthesis and greatly impressed the visitors. The paintings were combined into groups and accompanied with notes, and the interiors were decorated differently in order to emphasize their meanings and double the effect. The exhibition enjoyed enormous success and raised Diaghilev to the top of art and society elite.

Passionate to promote Russian art abroad, in 1906, Diaghilev organized and opened the 'Two Centuries of the Russian art and Sculpture' exposition at Salon d'Automne. It included 750 works from 103 authors, from modern artists to the ancient icons. The exhibition was designed by Léon Bakst and occupied 12 rooms in the Grand Palais. It, too, enjoyed enormous success and in many ways paved the way for the future success of the Ballet Russe. France was soon immersed in fashion à la russe. Diaghilev was offered the Legion of Honour award, but refused in honour of Bakst.

=== Imperial Theaters ===
In 1899, Prince Serge Wolkonsky received directorship of all Imperial theaters. On 10 September 1899, he gave Diaghilev the post of officer on special duty. The post was usually a nominal one, but since Diaghilev managed to actively engage into the theatrical world, he was soon made responsible for the production of the Annual of the Imperial Theaters. As editor-in-chief, he reformed the edition and converted it into a full-scale luxurious magazine with critical essays, playbills, articles about artists and lots of pictures. Diaghilev even changed the paper to print the issues. He invited many of his fellow members in Mir iskusstva to work on the magazine, design fonts and create illustrations. He also showed himself as a successful promoter by finding sponsors, advertisers, and new distribution channels. As recalled by Benois, the success of the magazine went to Sergey's head and very soon he was thinking about himself as 'the only one, without whom nothing can be done'.

At that time Diaghilev started frequent visits to repetitions of the Imperial Ballet. His appearance as a dandy with a grey lock amazed the ballerinas, who soon nicknamed him 'Chinchilla'. He was especially interested in young Mathilde Kschessinska, who was flattered by the attention of an already famous art connoisseur. Even though they would fight later and temporarily break contact, the friendship would last through all their lives.

Diaghilev brought the members of Mir iskusstva with him to the Imperial theatres. Apollinary Vasnetsov, Alexandre Benois, Léon Bakst, Valentin Serov, Eugene Lansere and other contemporary artists began working on decorations and costumes. In 1900, Prince Serge Wolkonsky entrusted Diaghilev with the staging of Léo Delibes' ballet Sylvia, a favorite of Benois. The two collaborators concocted an elaborate production plan that startled the established personnel of the Imperial Theatres. After several increasingly antagonistic differences of opinion, Diaghilev refused to go on editing the Annual of the Imperial Theatres and was discharged by Wolkonsky in 1901. However, the scandal also ruined Wolkonsky's career; in a week, he was similarly fired. By that time, even the Emperor, persuaded by Kschessinska, took Diaghilev's side. Sergei didn't think much of a civil servant career, so he went abroad and immersed in his other plans.

== Ballets Russes ==
=== Concerts historiques russes ===
The success of the 1906 exhibition inspired Diaghilev to present Russian music to the world's culture capitals such as Paris. In 1907, he organised 'Concerts historiques russes' with famous composers like Nikolai Rimsky-Korsakov, Sergei Rachmaninoff, Alexander Glazunov, Feodor Chaliapin, and Félia Litvinne. The tour was supported and sponsored by Diaghilev's royal patrons Grand Duke Andrei Vladimirovich of Russia and Duchess Marie of Mecklenburg-Schwerin. Alexander Ossovsky and music critic Michel-Dimitri Calvocoressi wrote the commemorative volume Cinq concerts historiques russes donnés sous le patronage de la Société des Grandes Auditions Musicales de France. In the spring of 1908, Diaghilev mounted a production of Mussorgsky's Boris Godunov, starring Feodor Chaliapin, at the Paris Opéra. Boris Anisfeld created the sets, designed by Bakst and Benois. To maximize authenticity, one of the artists Ivan Bilibin even travelled to Arkhangelsk Oblast to purchase the costumes. The tour became a sensation and the success was overwhelming, however, financially, it was unprofitable and ended with a loss of 85,000 francs.

=== Ballets Russes ===
By 1909, Diaghilev was at odds with Kschessinska, and the Russian state treasury refused to finance the future tours. Sergei turned for help to his other friend, Misia Sert. Due to her efforts, the company ended up being able to rent the Théâtre du Châtelet, which was less prestigious than the Palais Garnier. At that time, Diaghilev was rather skeptical about ballet; he said that 'anyone with no special wit can enjoy it, there is no sense or subject in ballet'. Serge Lifar recalled that to the end of his days Diaghilev referred to the corps-de-ballet dancers as 'a herd of cattle'. Nevertheless, in 1909 the very first ballet Saison Russe took place and its success overwhelmed even the artists themselves. The first season included Le Pavillon d'Armide, Polovtsian Dances, Nuit d’Egypte, Les Sylphides, and operas Boris Godunov, The Maid of Pskov and the first part of the Ruslan and Lyudmila. The ballets followed the operas and were performed after the second intermission. Leading dancers Vaslav Nijinsky, Anna Pavlova, Tamara Karsavina, Ida Rubinstein, Mikhail Mordkin immediately became world-known stars. Diaghilev's innovation was to synthesize dance, music and visual arts with set decorations and costumes into a single performance.

During these years, Diaghilev's stagings included several compositions by the late Nikolai Rimsky-Korsakov, such as the operas The Maid of Pskov, May Night, and The Golden Cockerel. His balletic adaptation of the orchestral suite Sheherazade, staged in 1910, drew the ire of the composer's widow, Nadezhda Rimskaya-Korsakova, who protested in open letters to Diaghilev published in the periodical Rech. Diaghilev commissioned ballet music from composers such as Nikolai Tcherepnin (Narcisse et Echo, 1911), Claude Debussy (Jeux, 1913), Maurice Ravel (Daphnis et Chloé, 1912), Erik Satie (Parade, 1917), Manuel de Falla (El Sombrero de Tres Picos, 1917), Richard Strauss (Josephslegende, 1914), Sergei Prokofiev (Ala and Lolli, 1915, rejected by Diaghilev and turned into the Scythian Suite; Chout, 1915 revised 1920; Le pas d'acier, 1926; and The Prodigal Son, 1929); Ottorino Respighi (La Boutique fantasque, 1919); Francis Poulenc (Les biches, 1923) and others. His choreographer Michel Fokine often adapted the music for ballet. Diaghilev also worked with dancer and ballet master Léonide Massine. He played a decisive role in the career of Sergey Prokofiev.

The artistic director for the Ballets Russes was Léon Bakst. Together they developed a more complicated form of ballet with show-elements intended to appeal to the general public, rather than solely the aristocracy. The exotic appeal of the Ballets Russes had an effect on Fauvist painters and the nascent Art Deco style. Coco Chanel is said to have stated that "Diaghilev invented Russia for foreigners".

Perhaps Diaghilev's most notable composer-collaborator, however, was Igor Stravinsky. Diaghilev heard Stravinsky's early orchestral works Fireworks and Scherzo fantastique, and was impressed enough to ask Stravinsky to arrange some pieces by Chopin for the Ballets Russes. In 1910, he commissioned his first score from Stravinsky, The Firebird. Petrushka (1911) and The Rite of Spring (1913) followed shortly afterwards, and the two also worked together on Les noces (1923) and Pulcinella (1920) together with Picasso, who designed the costumes and the set.

=== Late years ===
After the Russian Revolution of 1917, Diaghilev stayed abroad. Once it became obvious that he could not be lured back, the new Soviet regime condemned him in perpetuity as an especially insidious example of "bourgeois decadence". Soviet art historians wrote him out of the picture for more than 60 years.

Diaghilev made Boris Kochno his secretary in 1920 and staged Tchaikovsky's The Sleeping Beauty in London in 1921; it was a production of remarkable magnificence in both settings and costumes, but, despite being well received by the public, it was a financial disaster for Diaghilev and Oswald Stoll, the theatre-owner who had backed it. The first cast included the legendary ballerina Olga Spessivtseva and Lubov Egorova in the role of Aurora. Diaghilev insisted on calling the ballet The Sleeping Princess. When asked why, he quipped, "Because I have no beauties!" The later years of the Ballets Russes were often considered too "intellectual", too "stylish" and seldom had the unconditional success of the first few seasons, although younger choreographers like George Balanchine hit their stride with the Ballets Russes.

The start of the 20th century brought a development in the handling of tonality, harmony, rhythm and meter towards more freedom. Until that time, rigid harmonic schemes had forced rhythmic patterns to stay fairly uncomplicated. Around the turn of the century, however, harmonic and metric devices became either more rigid, or much more unpredictable, and each approach had a liberating effect on rhythm, which also affected ballet. Diaghilev was a pioneer in adapting these new musical styles to modern ballet. When Ravel used a 5/4 time in the final part of his ballet Daphnis and Chloe (1912), dancers of the Ballets Russes sang Ser-gei-dia-ghi-lev during rehearsals to keep the correct rhythm.

Members of Diaghilev's Ballets Russes later went on to found ballet traditions in the United States (George Balanchine) and England (Ninette de Valois and Marie Rambert). Ballet master Serge Lifar went on a technical revival at the Paris Opera Ballet, enhanced by Claude Bessy and Rudolf Nureyev in the 1980s. Lifar is credited for saving many Jewish and other minority dancers from the Nazi concentration camps during World War II. After dancing with the Ballets Russes in 1925, Ruth Page emerged as a founder of her own ballet troupes based in Chicago, including the Chicago Opera Ballet.

== Personal life ==
Diaghilev's life and the Ballets Russes were inextricably entwined. His most famous lover was Vaslav Nijinsky. However, according to Serge Lifar, of all Diaghilev's lovers, only Léonide Massine, who replaced Nijinsky, provided him with "so many moments of happiness or anguish". Diaghilev's other lovers included Anton Dolin, Serge Lifar and his secretary and librettist Boris Kochno.

Nijinsky's later bitter comments about Diaghilev inspired a mention in W. H. Auden's poem "September 1, 1939":

What mad Nijinsky wrote
About Diaghilev
Is true of the normal heart;
For the error bred in the bone
Of each woman and each man
Craves what it cannot have,
Not universal love
But to be loved alone.

Diaghilev dismissed Nijinsky summarily from the Ballets Russes after the dancer's marriage to Romola de Pulszky in 1913. Nijinsky appeared again with the company, but the old relationship between the men was never re-established; moreover, Nijinsky's magic as a dancer was much diminished by incipient mental illness. Their last meeting was after Nijinsky's mind had given way, and he appeared not to recognise his former lover.

Diaghilev was known as a hard, demanding, even frightening taskmaster. Ninette de Valois, no shrinking violet, said she was too afraid to ever look him in the face. George Balanchine said Diaghilev carried around a cane during rehearsals, and banged it angrily when he was displeased. Other dancers said he would shoot them down with one look, or a cold comment. On the other hand, he was capable of great kindness, and when stranded with his bankrupt company in Spain during the 1914–18 war, gave his last bit of cash to Lydia Sokolova to buy medical care for her daughter. Alicia Markova was very young when she joined the Ballets Russes and would later say that she had called Diaghilev "Sergypops", and that he had said he would take care of her like a daughter.

Dancers Alicia Markova, Tamara Karsavina, Serge Lifar, and Lydia Sokolova remembered Diaghilev as a stern but kind father-figure who put the needs of his dancers and company above his own. He lived from paycheck to paycheck to finance his company, and spent considerable amounts of money on a collection of rare books. Towards the end of his life, many people noticed that his impeccably cut suits had frayed cuffs and trouser-ends, likely due to excessive expenditures. Several sources have cited Diaghilev and the Ballets Russes as inspiration for the 1948 film The Red Shoes. (Note: Film expert Scott Salwolke comments, "Diaghilev obviously provided the model for [the film's impresario character] Lermontov... His tribute to Pavlova, following her death, of using a spotlight to take her place on stage would be re-created in The Red Shoes, as would be his dismissal of a dancer for having married." Film-makers Michael Powell and Emeric Pressburger both acknowledged the similarities but not that Diaghilev was the sole inspiration.)

== Death and legacy ==
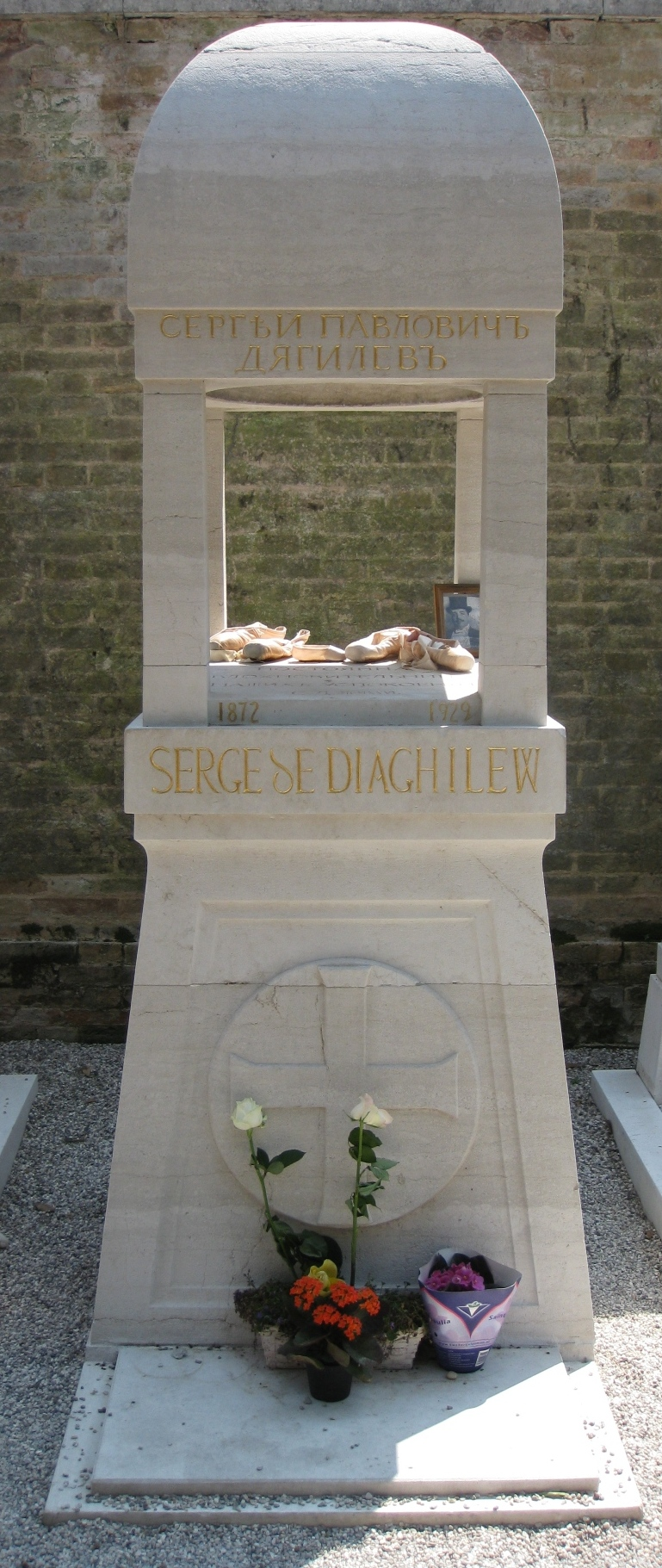
Diaghilev's gravestone, Isola di San Michele, Orthodox section, Venice, Italy (April 2011)

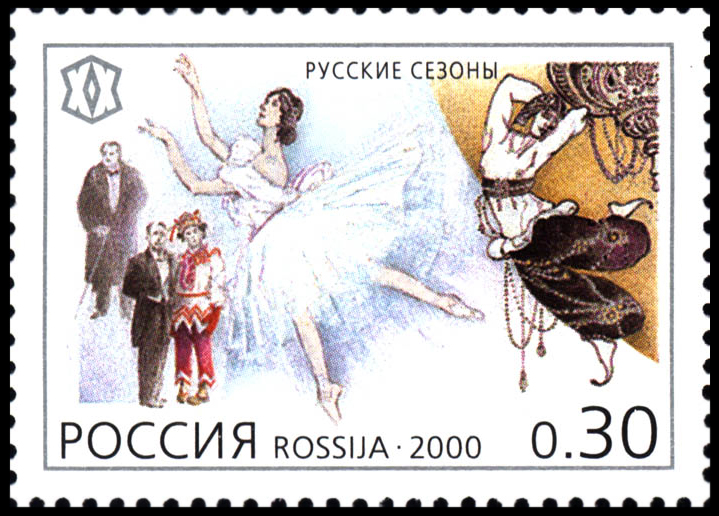

Diaghilev died of diabetes in Venice on 19 August 1929, aged 57. His tomb is on the nearby island of San Michele, near to the grave of Stravinsky, in the Orthodox section.

The Ekstrom Collection of the Diaghilev and Stravinsky Foundation is held by the Department of Theatre and Performance of the Victoria and Albert Museum.

Diaghilev was played by Alan Bates in the 1980 movie Nijinsky, and the Contemporary Art Museum in Saint Petersburg State University is named after him.

== See also ==
- List of dancers

== Sources ==
- Benois, Alexander (1980). Мои воспоминания [My Memories] (in Russian). Moscow: Nauka. p. 345. ISBN 978-5-517-95473-2.
- Levashev, E. (2011). History of Russian Music. Volume 10В. 1890—1917. Book 1 (in Russian). Vol. 1. Slavic Culture Languages. pp. 36–54. ISBN 978-5-9551-0508-6.
- Lifar, Serge (2013). Serge Diaghilev. Read Books. ISBN 978-1-4465-4694-9.
- Luchkin, A. V. (2013). "Ретроспективные выставки в Санкт-Петербурге: историзм мышления на рубеже XIX – XX вв" [Art Exhibitions in Saint Petersburg: Historicism on a Verge of XX and XX Centuries]. Questions of Museology (in Russian). pp. 31–40.
- Melnik, N. D. (2020). "В "зеркале" прессы: подготовка и проведение С. П. Дягилевым первого "Русского сезона" (1906)" [In the Mirror of “Press”: Preparation and Conduct of the first “Russian Season” by S. P. Diaghilev (1906)]. Novosibirsk State University Journal (in Russian). 19 (6): 48–58. doi:10.25205/1818-7919-2020-19-6-48-58.
- Portnova, T. V. (2011). "Историография и иконография "Русских балетных сезонов" С. Дягилева" [historiography and iconography «Russian seasons» of S. Diaghilev]. Journal of the Vaganova Ballet Academy. 1 (25): 100–115.
- Press, Stephen D. (2006). Prokofiev's Ballets for Diaghilev. Routledge. ISBN 978-0-7546-0402-0.
- Pritchard, Jane, editor (2010). Diaghilev and the Ballets Russes, 1909 -1929, London: V&A Publishing. ISBN 978-1-8517-7613-9
- Scheijen, Sjeng (2009). Diaghilev: A Life. London: Profile Books. ISBN 978-0-19-975149-5.
- Varakina, G. V. (2008). "Сергей Дягилев: "Мир искусства" и художественные выставки" [Sergey Diaghilev: “Mir Iskusstva” and Art Exhibitions] (PDF). Вопросы культурологии (12). Moscow: 28–33.
- Verveyko, G. (2020). Матильда Кшесинская – прима Императорского балета. Документальная повесть-роман о русском балете рубежа XIX-XX веков (in Russian). Izdatelskiye Resheniya. ISBN 978-5-4496-8997-9.
