= Sophie Pflanz =

Polish ballet dancer (1892–1978)

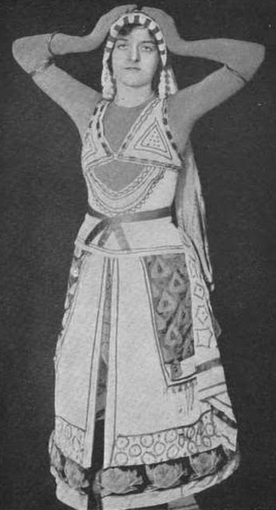
- Sophie Pflanz, from a 1916 publication, wearing a hand-painted costume by Léon Bakst
- Born: March 24, 1892
- Died: September 30, 1978 (aged 86)
- Other names: Zofia Maria Pflanz-Dróbecka, Sofie Pflanc, Zofia Maria Pflanc
- Occupation: dancer

Sophie Pflanz (March 24, 1892 – September 30, 1978), also known as Zofia Maria Pflanz-Dróbecka, was a Polish ballet dancer with the Ballets Russes from 1911 to 1917.

== Early life ==
Zofia Maria Pflanz was born in Warsaw, the daughter of Wincenty Wilhelm Pflanz and Janina Kazimiera Maria Kęszycka Pflanz. She trained as a dancer in Warsaw, and at the Imperial School in Petrograd.

== Career ==
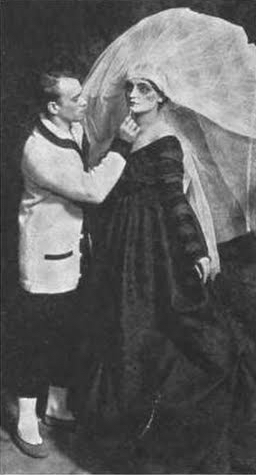
Nijinsky examining the stage makeup of Sophie Pflanz, from a 1916 publication.

Pflanz danced with the Ballets Russes under Sergei Diaghilev, touring in the company with Adolph Bolm, Léonide Massine, Xenia Makletzova, Valentina Kachouba, Tamara Karsavina, Enrico Cecchetti, and many others. She appeared in productions of Khovanshchina (1913), Papillons (1914), Midas (1914), Prince Igor (1914), and La Légende de Joseph (1914) in Monte Carlo, Paris, and London. On tour with the Ballets Russes in the United States, she danced in Prince Igor, Daphnis et Chloé, Nijinsky's Afternoon of a Faun (1916), Till Eulenspiegel (1916), and Cléopâtre (1917).

After her time with the Ballets Russes, Pflanz returned to Warsaw, where she continued to dance as a soloist, and was head of a ballet company that toured abroad. She taught ballet in Warsaw and later in Torún, for many years. One of her students in Warsaw was Maria Krzyszkowska.

== Personal life ==
Sophie Pflanz married Stanisław Burma-Dróbecki, Diaghilev's private secretary, in London in 1911. She died in 1978, aged 86 years.
