= Les Orientales (ballet) =

1910 choreographic divertissement by Michel Fokine

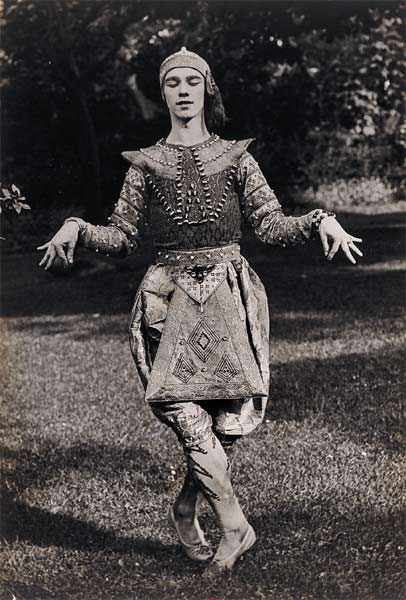
Nijinsky in Les Orientales

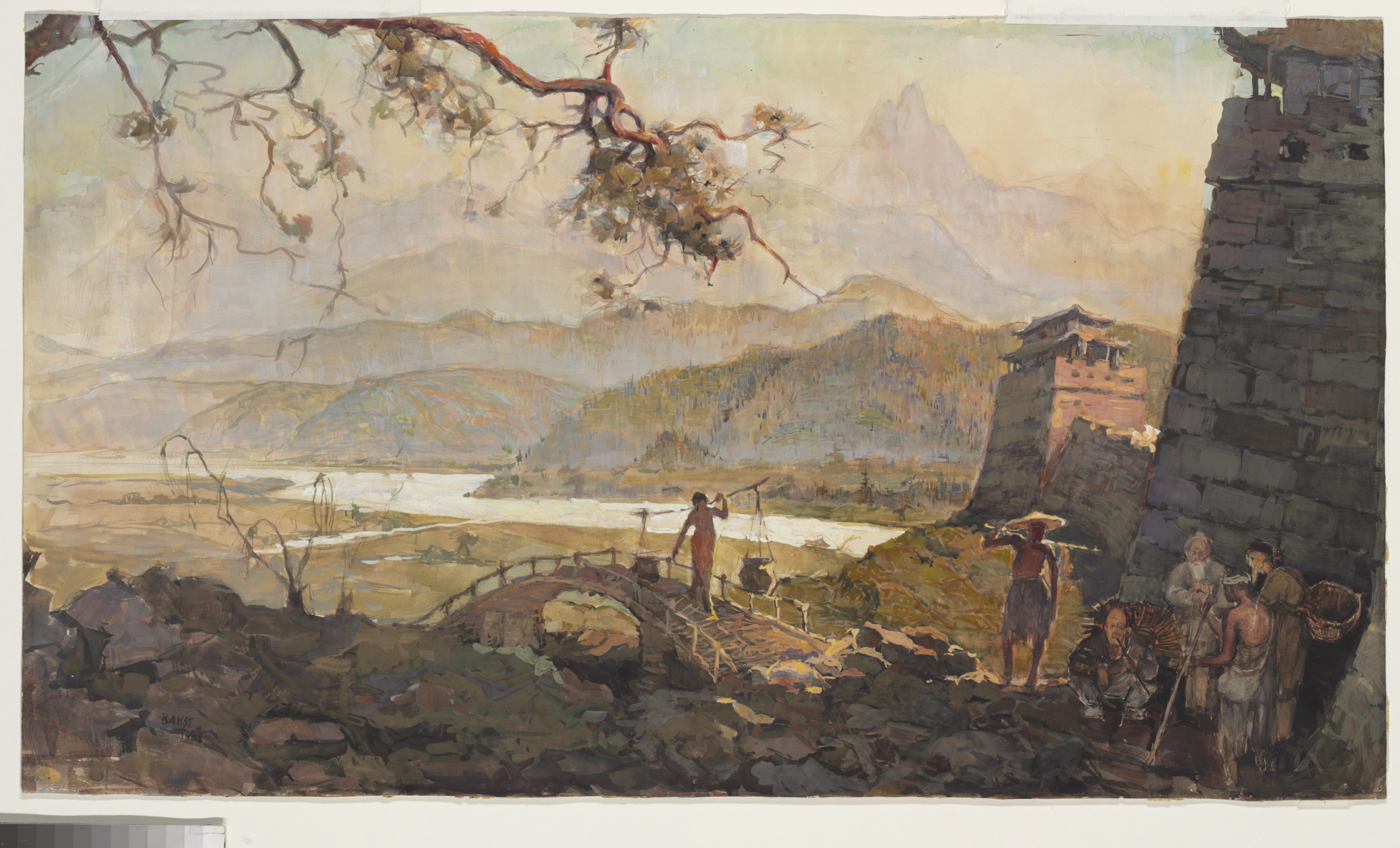
Set design for Les Orientales by Léon Bakst

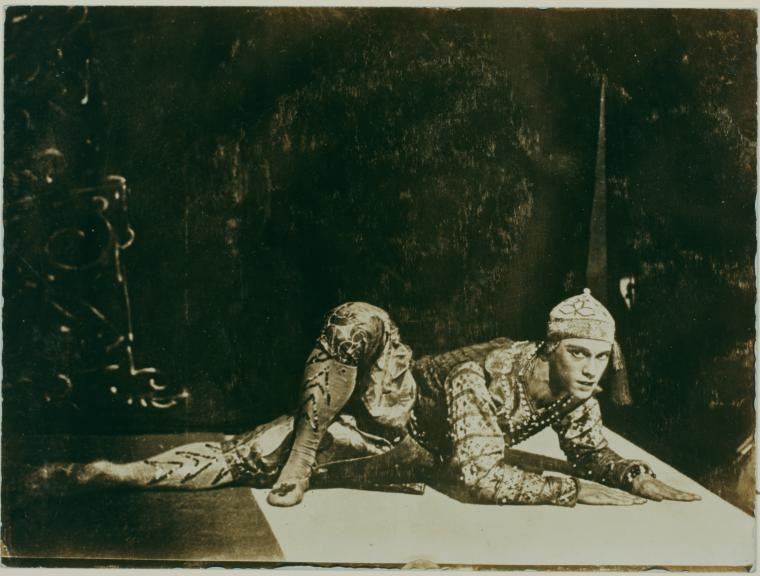
Vaslav Nijinsky performs in Les Orientales

Les Orientales is a choreographic divertissement by Michel Fokine. A production of Ballets Russes, it was premiered on June 25, 1910, at the Theatre National de l'Opera in Paris.

The ballet consisted of a series of oriental-themed dances performed by soloists Vaslav Nijinsky (Danse Siamoise and Kobold), Tamara Karsavina (Assyrian Dance), Vera Fokina, Alexander Orlov (Saracens’ Dance), Catherine Gheltzer and Alexander Volinine (pas de deux). The dances were choreographed by Michel Fokine and Marius Petipa. The music was by Alexander Glazunov, Christian Sinding, Anton Arensky, and Edvard Grieg.

Michel Fokine, who choreographed Vaslav Nijinsky's "Danse Siamoise", may have been “inspired by a Thai Classical troupe, the Nai But Mahin Dance Company, that Fokine had seen in St. Petersburg in 1900.”

Léon Bakst started working on scenic design and costumes for Les Orientales in 1908. In 1909, Bakst made a name for himself as a scene-painter for Diaghilev with the Ballets Russes.He designed scenery and costumes for Cleopatra (1909), Scheherazade (1910), and Carnaval (1910). In 1910, Konstantin Korovin continued working on scenic design and costumes for Les Orientales in collaboration with Léon Bakst.
