= Le Pavillon d'Armide =

1907 ballet

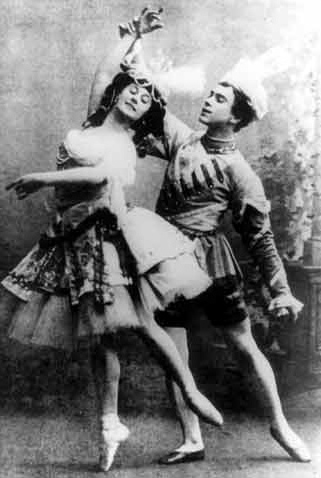
Vaslav Nijinsky and Anna Pavlova, 1909

Le Pavillon d'Armide is a ballet in one act and three scenes choreographed by Michel Fokine with music by Nikolai Tcherepnin to a libretto by Alexandre Benois. It was inspired by the novella Omphale by Théophile Gautier.

== History ==
The work was first presented on 25 November 1907 at the Mariinsky Theatre in Saint Petersburg, with staging and costumes by Alexandre Benois. Principal dancers were Anna Pavlova in the role of Armida, Vaslav Nijinsky as her slave, and Pavel Gerdt as the Vicomte René de Beaugency and Rozai as the Clown.

Other dancers included young Lydia Kyasht, Lubov Tchernicheva, and Tamara Karsavina.

On 19 May 1909, the ballet was presented by Sergei Diaghilev's Ballets Russes at the Théâtre du Châtelet, Paris. The role of Armida was danced by Vera Karalli, the Vicomte de Beaugency by Mikhail Mordkin, and the Slave by Nijinsky. As the first ballet presented in Paris by Diaghilev, its success was due in part to its French theme. The 1909 season also included works based on Russian folklore which also met with public approval.
