= Troy Kinney =

American artist (1871–1938)

Troy Sylvanus Kinney
- Troy Kinney
- Born: December 1, 1871; Kansas City, Missouri
- Died: January 29, 1938 (aged 66); Falls Village, Connecticut
- Occupation: Illustrator
- Known for: Joint work as The Kinneys
- Spouse: Margaret Winifred West

Troy Sylvanus Kinney (December 1, 1871 – January 29, 1938) was an American artist, etcher, and author. Troy Kinney was most notable for his works portraying dance performers, fanciful subjects, and classically styled nudes. He worked with dancers, including Ruth St. Denis, Anna Pavlova, and Sophie Pflanz among others. His artistic works are part of the collections of the Art Institute of Chicago, the Cleveland Museum of Art, the New York Public Library, the Library of Congress, and many others.

== Early life and career ==
Troy Sylvanus Kinney was born the son of William and Mary Kinney in Kansas City, Missouri. He attended Yale University, graduating in 1896, and then after a brief time illustrating for newspapers in the Baltimore, Maryland area, he moved to study at the Art Institute of Chicago, where he would later become a full member of the Chicago Society of Etchers. He met and in 1900 married his wife and collaborator Margaret West Kinney (1872–1952). They were premier illustrators of the early 20th century, creating works together under the name "The Kinneys", including scores of books, and covers for Harper's Bazaar magazine.

== Artistic career ==
Perhaps Troy Kinney's greatest legacy is in his contributions in the area of dance. He co-authored with his wife the books "Social Dancing of Today" and "The Dance: Its Place in Art and Life", for which he traveled throughout the world to study various dance styles. It remains to this day one of the most comprehensive works on the subject.

Besides being a member of the Chicago Society of Etchers, Troy Kinney was a member of the Society of American Etchers, and the National Academy of Design.

Troy Kinney died near his art studio in Falls Village, Connecticut, leaving his wife and only child, John West Kinney.

== Books ==
- Kinney, Troy and Royal Cortissoz - The Etchings of Troy Kinney 1929
- Kinney, Troy and Margaret West Kinney - The Dance: Its Place in Art and Life 1914, New York, Frederick A. Stokes Company
- Morgan Charles - Troy Kinney. American Etchers- Volume IX. 1930
- Serge Leslie - Selected Letters of Troy Kinney to Doris Niles 1952

== Sources ==
- Online Archive of California
- Social Dancing of Today free online text
- Some selected works of Troy Kinney
