= The Nightingale (opera) =

Opera by Igor Stravinsky

- Opera by Igor Stravinsky
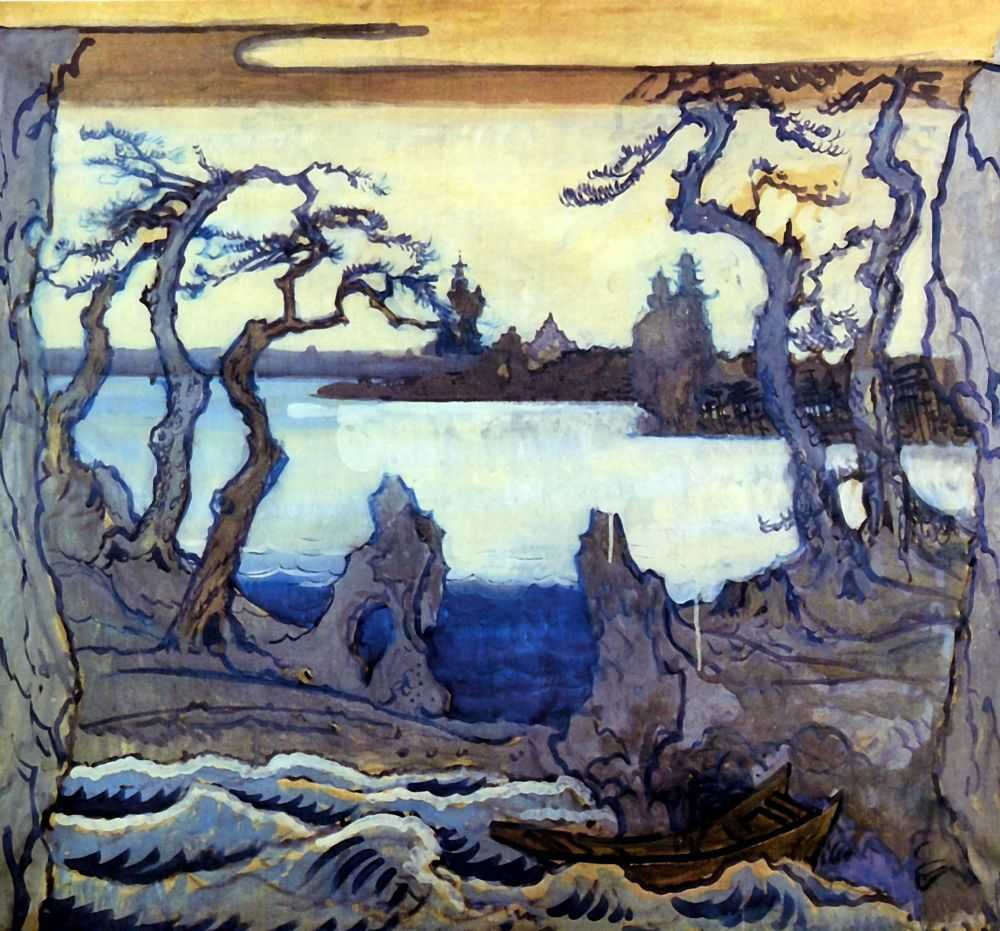
- Set design for the premiere by Alexandre Benois
- Description: lyric tale
- Native title: Russian: Соловей
- Librettist: the composer; Stepan Mitusov
- Based on: "The Nightingale" by Hans Christian Andersen
- Premiere: 26 May 1914; Palais Garnier, Paris

The Nightingale (Russian: Соловей, romanized: Solovey) is a short opera in three acts by Igor Stravinsky to a Russian-language libretto by him and Stepan Mitusov, based on a tale by Hans Christian Andersen: a Chinese Emperor is reduced to tears and made kind by a small grey bird. It was completed on 28 March 1914 and premiered a few weeks later, on 26 May, by the Ballets Russes conducted by Pierre Monteux at the Palais Garnier in Paris. Publication, by the then Paris-based Éditions Russes de Musique, followed only in 1923 and caused the opera to become known by its French title of Le Rossignol and French descriptor of conte lyrique, or lyric tale, despite its being wholly Russian.

== Composition ==
Stravinsky began work on the opera in 1908 but put it aside after receiving the next year the commission from Sergei Diaghilev for the ballet The Firebird. He returned to it in 1913 after he had completed three ballets for Diaghilev, Petrushka and The Rite of Spring being the others. Act 1, set at the seashore, was mostly complete by 1909; acts 2 and 3, set at court, were finished in early 1914. Stravinsky was no doubt aware of the advances in his style and technique during the intervening years.

In 1917, Stravinsky created a separate concert work, a symphonic poem, from music from the opera. It was published in 1921 as Chant du Rossignol (Song of the Nightingale).

== Performance history ==
For the opera's premiere, the singers were in the pit while their roles were mimed and danced on stage; the mise-en-scène was by Alexandre Benois, who also designed the sets and costumes, and Alexander Sanin; Boris Romanov was the choreographer. The American premiere took place on 6 March 1926, but in French, at the Metropolitan Opera; this company would perform The Nightingale in its original language for the first time on 3 December 1981.

The Santa Fe Opera in New Mexico presented many operas by Stravinsky during the decade after its founding in 1956. These included, in 1957, The Rake's Progress. Performances of The Nightingale with Stravinsky himself conducting took place in 1962 as part of the composer's 80th birthday celebrations. Other stagings took place in 1963, 1969, 1970 and 1973. In 2014 The Nightingale was paired with Mozart's The Impresario; its action took place in Paris in the 1920s. Santa Fe's cast this time included Brenda Rae, Erin Morley, Meredith Arwady and Anthony Michaels-Moore.

In its 2009 Toronto season, the Canadian Opera Company staged the opera together with shorter works by Stravinsky as The Nightingale and Other Short Fables. This production, directed by Robert Lepage, toured to Japan (the New National Theatre Tokyo), France (2010, Aix-en-Provence Festival), the United States (2011, Brooklyn Academy of Music), Australia (2024 Adelaide Festival).

== Roles ==
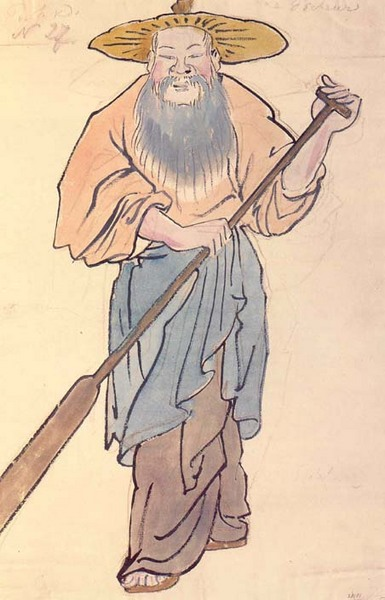
Costume design by Benois for the Fisherman

Roles, voice types, premiere cast
Role	Voice type	Premiere cast, 26 May 1914 Conductor: Pierre Monteux
Nightingale (Соловей)	coloratura soprano	Aurelia Dobrovolska
Fisherman (Рыбак)	tenor	Aleksandr Varfolomejev
Cook (Кухарочка)	soprano	Maria Brian
Emperor (Император)	bass	Pjotr Pavel Andrejev
Chamberlain (Камергер)	bass	Aleksandr Belianin
Bonze (Бонза)	bass	Nikolaj Goulajev
Death (Смерть)	contralto	Elisabeth Petrenko
1st Japanese emissary (Японский посол 1)	soprano	Mamsina
2nd Japanese emissary	bass	Vasilj Saranov
3rd Japanese emissary	tenor	Fodor Ernst

== Synopsis ==
Time: Ancient times
Place: China.

The Fisherman acts as commentator on the story's events.

=== Act 1 ===
At the seashore just before sunrise, a Fisherman hears the song of the Nightingale, which causes him to forget his troubles. The Cook has brought officials from the court of the Emperor to hear the Nightingale, telling of the beauty of its singing. However, the Nightingale is nowhere to be heard. The Court Chamberlain promises the Cook a position as private cook to the Emperor, if she can find the Nightingale, who finally appears, and receives an invitation from the Cook and the Chamberlain to sing for the Emperor. The Nightingale accepts the invitation, but says that its sweetest song is in the forest.

=== Act 2 ===
Courtiers festoon the palace with lanterns in advance of the singing of the Nightingale. The Cook describes the Nightingale to the courtiers noting that it is small, gray and virtually invisible, but its song causes its listeners to cry. A procession denotes the Emperor's arrival. He commands the Nightingale to sing, and its singing touches him so deeply that he offers the bird a reward of a golden slipper to wear about its neck. Later, three Japanese emissaries offer the Emperor a mechanical nightingale, which begins to sing. The Emperor is delighted by this novelty. Taking insult at this, the genuine bird flies away, and the angered emperor orders it banished from his realm. He names the mechanical bird "first singer".

=== Act 3 ===
The Emperor is ill and near death; the figure of Death appears in the Emperor's chamber. The ghosts of the Emperor's past deeds visit him while he calls for his court musicians, but the genuine Nightingale has reappeared, in defiance of the imperial edict, and has begun to sing. Death hears the Nightingale's song and is greatly moved, and asks it to continue, which it does on condition that Death returns to the emperor his crown, sword and standard. Death assents and gradually removes himself from the scene as the Nightingale continues to sing. The Emperor slowly regains his strength, and on seeing the Nightingale, offers it the "first singer" post at court. The Nightingale says that it is satisfied with the Emperor's tears as reward, and promises to sing for him each night from dusk until dawn.

== Recordings ==
Year	Cast: Nightingale, Emperor, Cook, Death, Bonze, Fisherman, Chamberlain	Conductor, orchestra and chorus	Label
1955	Micheau/Giraudeau/Lovano/Roux	Cluytens	Columbia
1960	Grist/Driscoll/Gramm/Smith-K	Stravinsky	Columbia
1984	Rolandi/Creech/Meredith/Cheek	Levine	Met label on CD
1990	Phyllis Bryn Julson, Neil Howlett, Felicity Palmer, Elizabeth Laurence, Michael George, Ian Caley, John Tomlinson	Pierre Boulez, BBC Singers and BBC Symphony Orchestra	CD: Erato Disques; Cat.: 4509-98955-2 plus other pieces
1997	Olga Trifonova, Paul Whelan, Pippa Longworth, Sally Burgess, Andrew Greenan, Robert Tear, Stephen Richardson	Robert Craft, London Voices and Philharmonia Orchestra	CD: MusicMasters, later Naxos; Cat.: 8557501 plus The Rite of Spring
1999	Natalie Dessay, Albert Schagidullin, Marie McLaughlin, Violeta Urmana, Maxime Mikhailov, Vsevolod Grivnov, Laurent Naouri	James Conlon, Chorus and Orchestra of the Opéra National de Lyon	CD: EMI Classics; Cat.: 7243 5 56874 2 5 plus Renard; a film by Chaudet was made of The Nightingale a few years later using this recording and released as a Virgin Classics DVD: Cat.: 7243 5 44242 9 8
2011	Novikova/Poli/Bondarenko/Schuen	Bolton	Salzburg Festival label
2012	Erdmann/Akimov/Vaneev/Pursio	Saraste	Orfeo studio recording
2023	Devieilhe/Dubois/Bou/Naouri	Roth-FX	Erato, live in Paris
