= Cléopâtre (ballet) =

Ballet with choreography by Mikhail Fokine

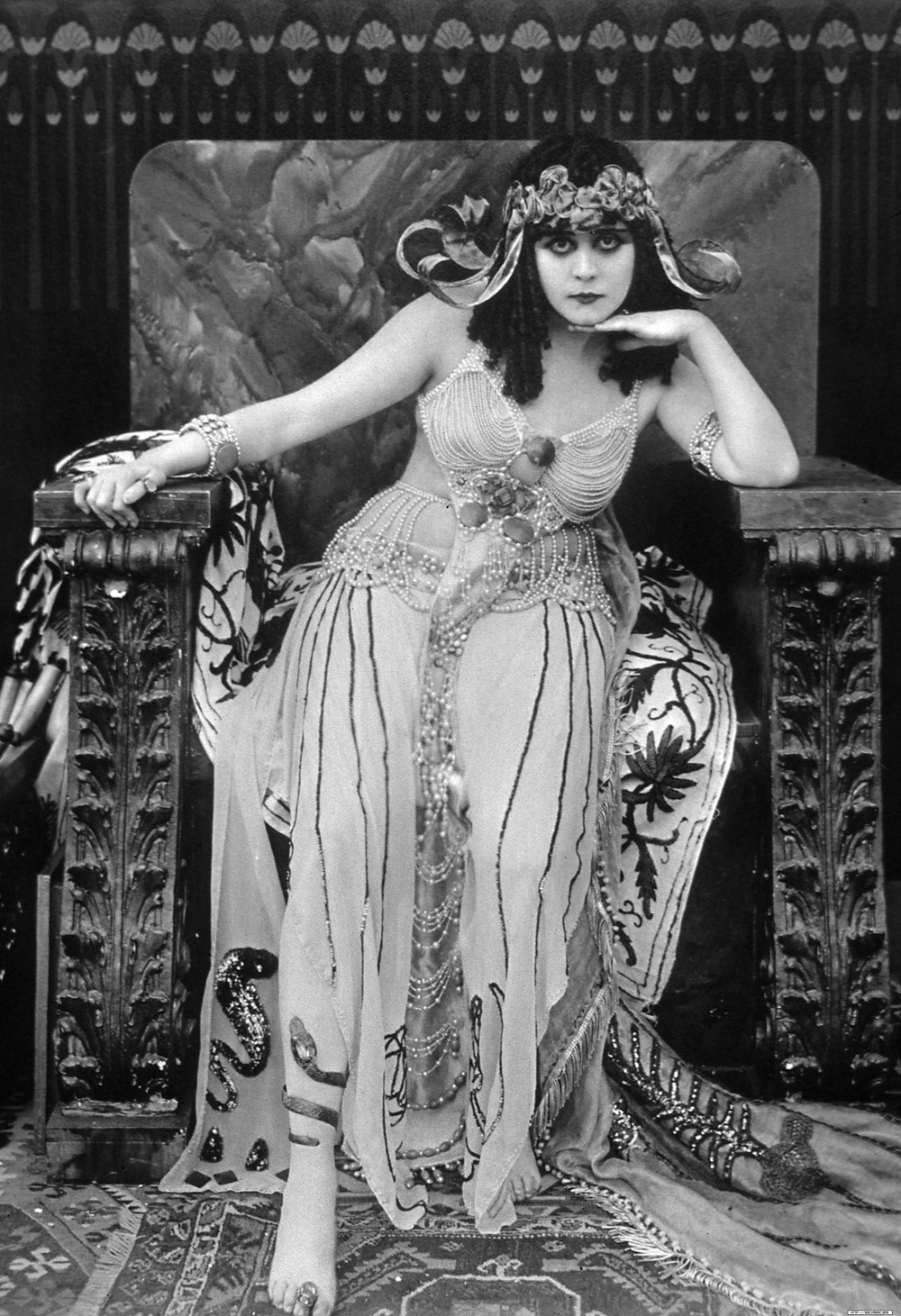
Theda Bara as Cleopatra, 1917

Cléopâtre is a ballet in one act with choreography by Mikhail Fokine and music by Anton Arensky, Alexander Taneyev, Nikolai Rimsky-Korsakov, Mikhail Glinka, Alexander Glazunov, Modeste Mussorgsky, and Nikolai Tcherepnin. The scenery and costumes were created by Léon Bakst. The first production opened at Théâtre du Châtelet in Paris on June 2, 1909.

The ballet starred Anna Pavlova as Ta-hor and Ida Rubinstein as Cleopatra. Mikhail Fokine himself danced Amoun. The favourite slaves of Cleopatra were danced by Tamara Karsavina and Vaslav Nijinsky. Other characters included Servants of the Temple, Egyptian Dancers, Greeks, Satyrs, Jewish Dancers, Syrian Musicians and Slaves.

Cyril W. Beaumont writes that Cléopâtre is a largely based on a ballet called Une Nuit d'Égypte that was first produced by Fokine at the Mariinsky Theatre in St. Petersburg, Russia in 1908. The veil dance features Glinka's "Danse Orientale" from his opera Russlan and Ludmilla. "Danse Persane" from Mussogsky's Khovanchina was used as well.

== History ==
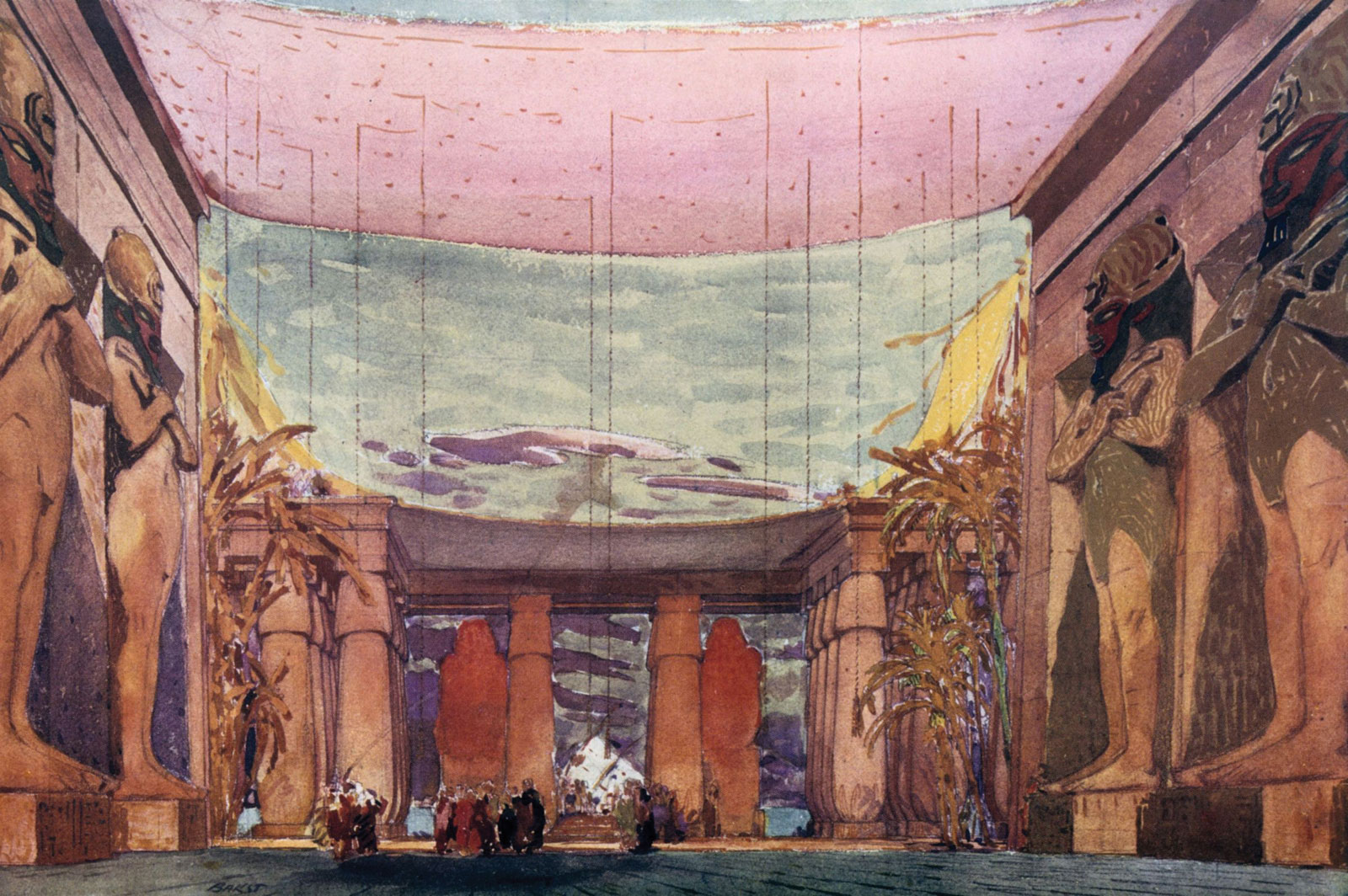
Léon Bakst’s set design for the 1909 Ballets Russes production of Cléopâtre

The first performance of Cléopâtre was staged by Fokine in Russia. The ballet was presented as Une Nuit d’Egypte, at the Mariinsky Theatre, St Petersburg on 2 March 1908. He used solely Arensky’s score for the entire show, and borrowed most of the costumes from The Pharaoh's Daughter and Aida. The soloist costumes were instead designed by Léon Bakst, and the sets, borrowed from an opera performed at the time at the Mariinsky, were retouched by Oreste Allegri.

The ballet was later represented in Paris at the Théâtre du Châtelet on 2 June 1909 for the opening season of the Ballets Russes, produced by Serge Diaghilev. For this version, Fokine decided to cast Ida Rubinstein, one of his students, for the main role, and Alexandre Benois suggested Léon Bakst for the sets and costumes design of the entire production.

During a tour to Latin America in 1917, the sets were destroyed in a fire. Therefore, Diaghilev ordered new sceneries to Robert Delaunay, while his wife, Sonia Delaunay, designed the costumes for the new soloists Lubov Tchernicheva and Leonide Massine. The new production opened at the London Coliseum Theatre on 5 September 1918.

== Plot ==
Set in Egypt, the ballet tells the story of two young lovers, Ta-Hor and Amoun. They meet in the grounds of a temple, when the high priest interrupts them, announcing the arrival of the Queen Cleopatra and her court. Amoun falls in love with the Queen’s beauty, and declares his love with a message. Cleopatra accepts to spend a night with him, but in return he must drink poison the following morning. Ta-Hor tries to dissuade Amoun, but his passion is too strong. The ballet closes with Ta-Hor going back to the temple, to find the dead body of her lover.

== Production ==
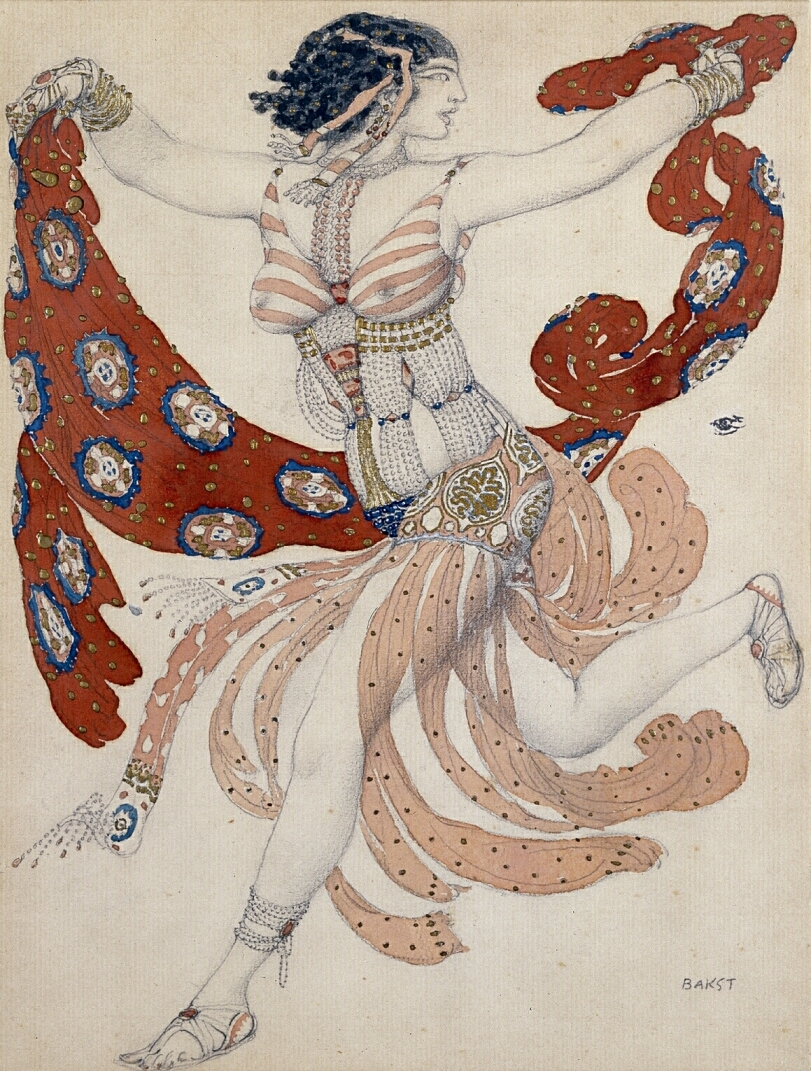
Léon Bakst, Costume of Cleopatra for Ida Rubinstein, 1909.

Cléopâtre was the most sumptuous production in the Ballets Russes’ 1909 season, due to the extraordinary design by Bakst. The dancers’ bodies gave life to his reduced costumes, that glittered like precious stones against a scenery of desert and Egyptian architecture. He used gold, lapis blue, malachite green, pink, orange and violet to embellish the characters’ costumes, jewels and weapons, imitating the motifs of what was believed to be Egyptian at the time.

== Cast ==
For the Ballets Russes opening in 1909, the role of Cleopatra was interpreted by Ida Rubinstein. She was not a professional dancer, but her unconventional beauty and incredible sensuality strongly impressed the audience. In her first appearance in the ballet, she was carried in a mummy-case and sensually unwrapped from the many-colored veils. Amoun was played by Fokine himself, and Ta-Hor by Anna Pavlova.

== Audience response ==
The costumes caused a sensation, since they presented several bare sections of the dancers’ bodies. The artists were instead wearing ‘fleshings’, a skin-colour silk or jersey inserts to shorten the time required for body make-up. This technique was used until 1912, but unfortunately most of these inserts didn’t survive, and don’t appear to be evident in any retouched stage photography of the time. Moreover, Cléopâtre, together with Scheherazade, started a new mania for exoticism in fashion and interior design.

This ballet was revived by Diaghilev in 1918.
