= Valentina Kachouba =

Russian ballet dancer

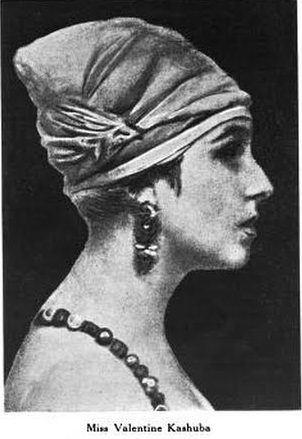
- Valentina Kachouba, from a 1919 publication.
- Born: 14 May 1898; Russia
- Died: 12 January 1997 (aged 98); Madrid
- Other names: Valentina Kashuba, Valentine Kachouba

Valentina Kachouba (May 14, 1898 – 12 January 1997), also written as Valentine Kashuba, was a Russian ballet dancer, a member of Diaghilev's Ballets Russes company from 1916 and 1921; as one of the last surviving members of the troupe, her memories and photographs were considered especially valuable as a record of the ballet and its members.

== Early life ==
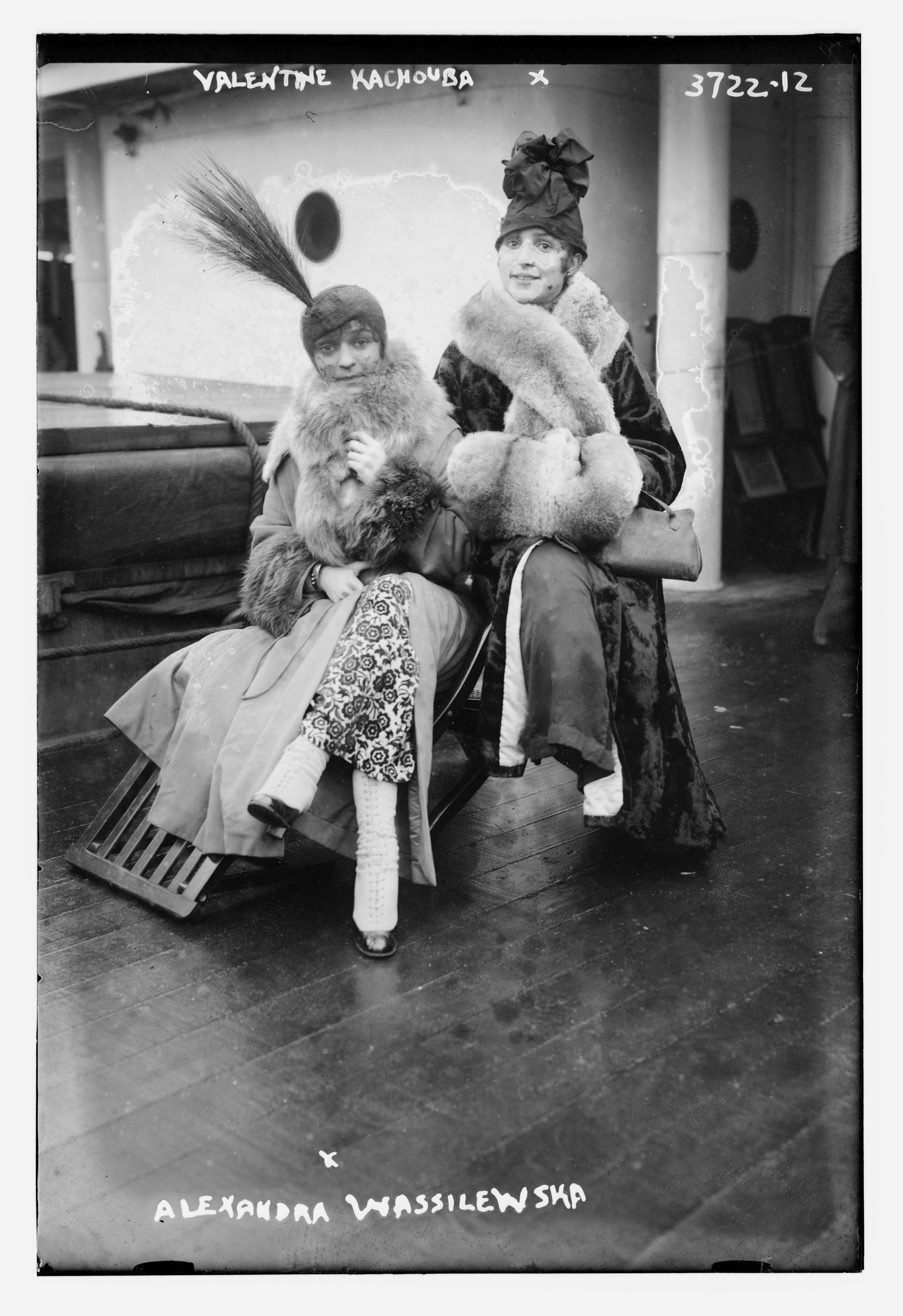
Valentina Kachouba and Alexandra Wassilewska, from the Library of Congress.

Kachouba was said to be from Moscow, or in some publicity, the daughter of a guard officer and a Persian princess in Samarkand.

== Career ==
Kachouba was a member of the Ballets Russes when it toured with Sergei Diaghilev in 1916. Other dancers in the troupe at the time included Xenia Makletzova, Lydia Sokolova, Léonide Massine, Adolf Bolm, Enrico Cecchetti, Nicolas Zverev, Flore Revalles, Lydia Lopokova, and Ekaterina Galanta. In 1918 she was with the Salvati Opera Company in Peru, when she gave an impromptu speech about Russia during Armistice celebrations in Lima.

Kachouba danced in New York in 1926, announcing astrological and mystical inspirations for her dances (or "plastomimic preachings", as she described her work). "I will dance only in a solemn atmosphere," she promised, dismissing vaudeville venues, "an observatory, lecture hall, temple, or, perhaps, something that I will build myself." She danced at the Metropolitan Opera House in 1929, in Stravinsky's Les Noces, under the direction of Leopold Stokowski, with other performers including Aaron Copland, Nina Koshetz, and Sophie Braslau. In 1931 and 1932, she was in the large casts of charity shows at Madison Square Garden, both benefiting the Judson Health Center.

Kachouba lived her later years in Madrid, where she taught ballet and produced dance programs; she also designed ballet costumes and sets. In 1979, Kachouba gave an oral history interview for the New York Public Library's Dance Audio Archive. In 1989, she was interviewed as one of the last surviving cast members of Nijinsky's lost final ballet, Till . That same year, her photographs of the Ballets Russes were published.

== Personal life ==
Kachouba died in 1997, aged 98 years, in Madrid.
