= Nevsky Pickwickians =

Former society of art students at the University of St. Petersburg, Russia

The Nevsky Pickwickians was an informal circle of art-loving and intellectual friends who were students at the University of St. Petersburg, Russia at the end of the 19th century. The group originally included Alexandre Benois (effectively its leader), Léon Bakst, Walter Nouvel, Dmitry Filosofov and Konstantin Somov.

In 1890, Filosofov introduced his cousin Serge Diaghilev to the group. Although at first the older members considered Diaghilev to be provincial, he quickly learned from the other members (especially Benois) and eventually displayed his innate talent for organization and administration.

In 1898, members of The Nevsky Pickwickians founded the journal Mir iskusstva (World of Art) with the financial backing of Princess Maria Tenisheva and Savva Mamontov.

Diaghilev went on to become the impresario of the Ballets Russes which gave its first performances in Paris in 1909. Over the course of the next twenty years (until Diaghilev's death in 1929), the company continued as one of the period's most influential performing arts organizations. Its success was due, in no small part, to the participation of "Nevsky Pickwickians" Benois and Bakst, who designed sets and costumes for many of its productions.
