= The Nightingale (fairy tale) =

Literary fairy tale by Hans Christian Andersen

- Short story by Hans Christian Andersen
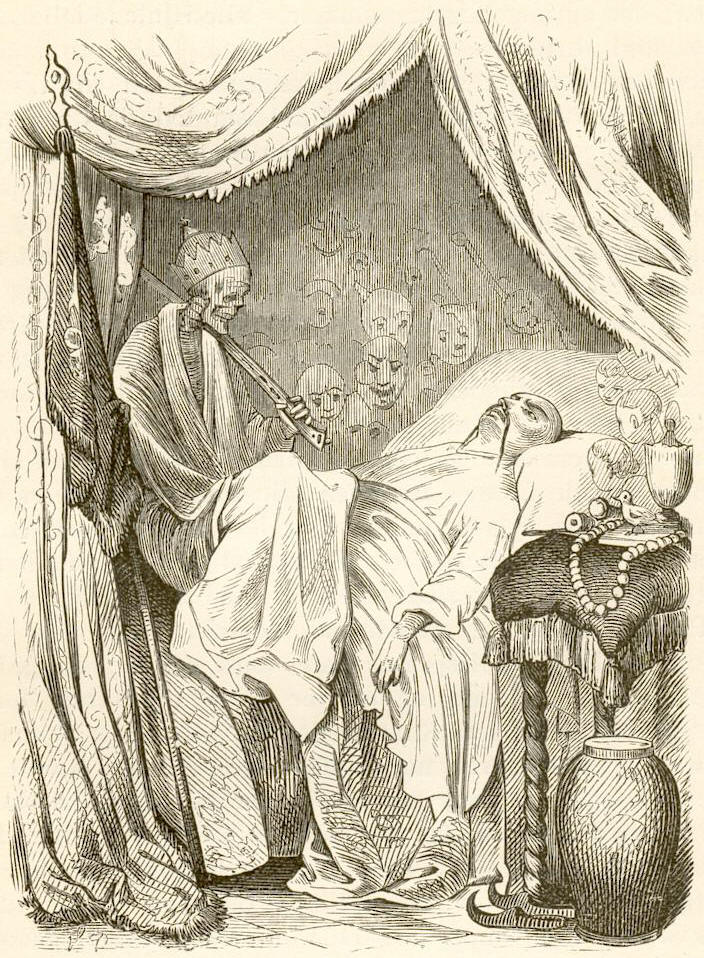
- Illustration by Vilhelm Pedersen
- Original title: Nattergalen
- Country: Denmark
- Language: Danish
- Genre: Literary fairy tale

Publication
- Published in: New Fairy Tales. First Volume. First Collection (Nye Eventyr. Første Bind. Første Samling)
- Publication type: Fairy tale collection
- Publisher: C.A. Reitzel
- Publication date: 1843

"The Nightingale" (Danish: Nattergalen) is a literary fairy tale written by Danish author Hans Christian Andersen, published in 1843. Set in imperial China, the story recounts the friendship between the Emperor of China and a nightingale.

== Plot ==
In the gardens of the Emperor of China lived a nightingale whose song was more beautiful than the palace itself and was storied all over the world. When the emperor received a book from the Emperor of Japan, he was astonished to read about the nightingale, because he had never heard of it, nor had anyone in his court. He commanded that the nightingale be brought before him to sing. With the help of a poor kitchen girl, the nightingale was found and brought to the emperor, where it sang so beautifully that the emperor was moved to tears and made it a guest at court.

Soon after, the emperor received a new gift: a jeweled nightingale automaton that also sang. This nightingale's song was pretty, but always the same. The real nightingale, no longer appreciated, flew out of the palace while no one was looking. The emperor placed the artificial nightingale at his bedside and banished the real nightingale for its desertion. The artificial bird sang the emperor to sleep each night until its cogs wore down. The bird was repaired, but it could be played only once a year.

Five years afterward, the emperor fell ill. One night Death sat on his chest showing him the deeds of his past. The emperor wished for the artificial nightingale to sing away the unpleasant memories, but it was silent. Then a song erupted through the window, where the real nightingale was perched. The song restored the emperor's health and persuaded Death to leave him in peace. The nightingale declined to become a guest in the palace again, but offered to come when it would and sing about all that it had seen in the kingdom, if the emperor agreed to keep this a secret between them.

== Gallery ==
Illustrations by Edmund Dulac from a 1911 edition.

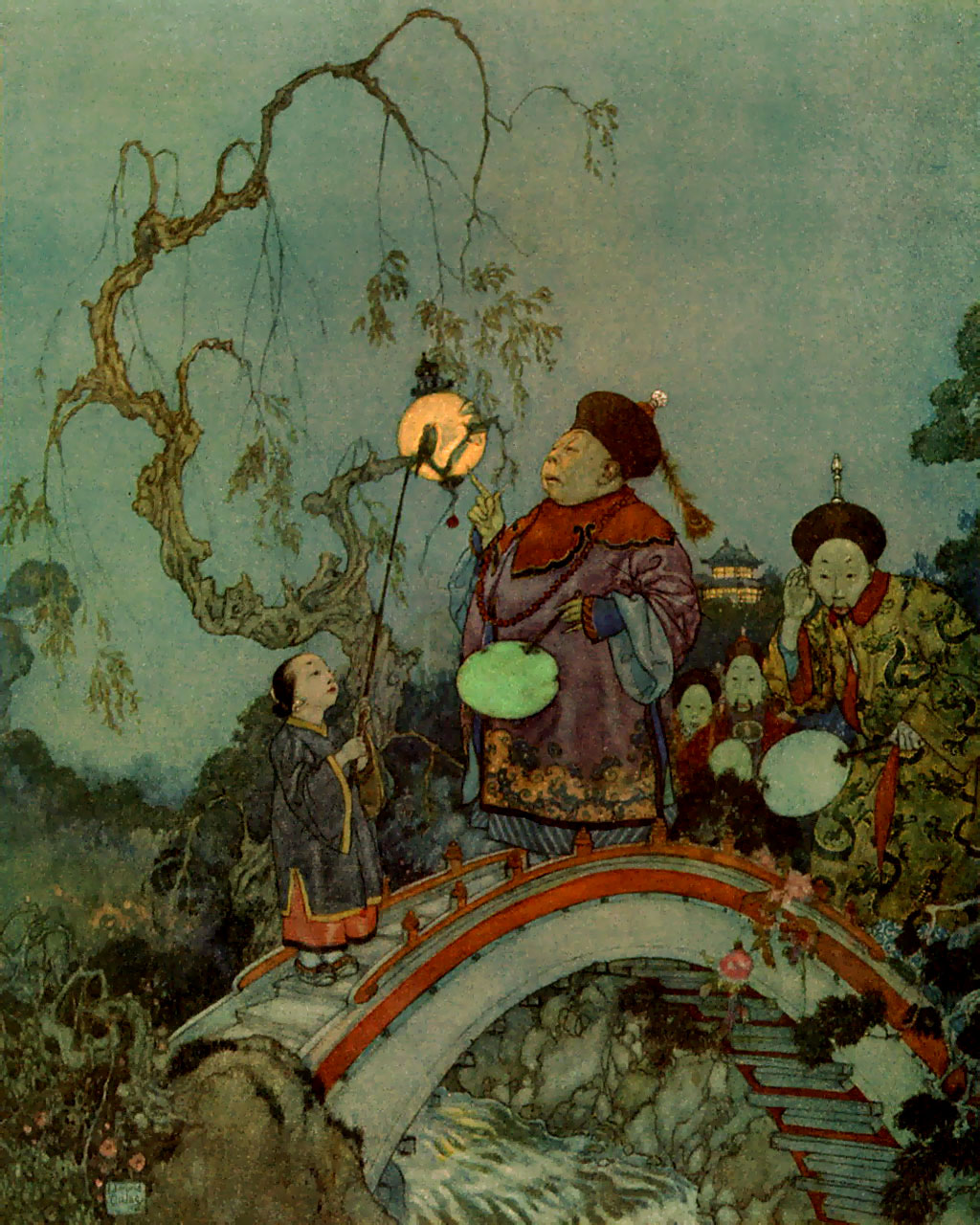
How common it looks, said the chamberlain

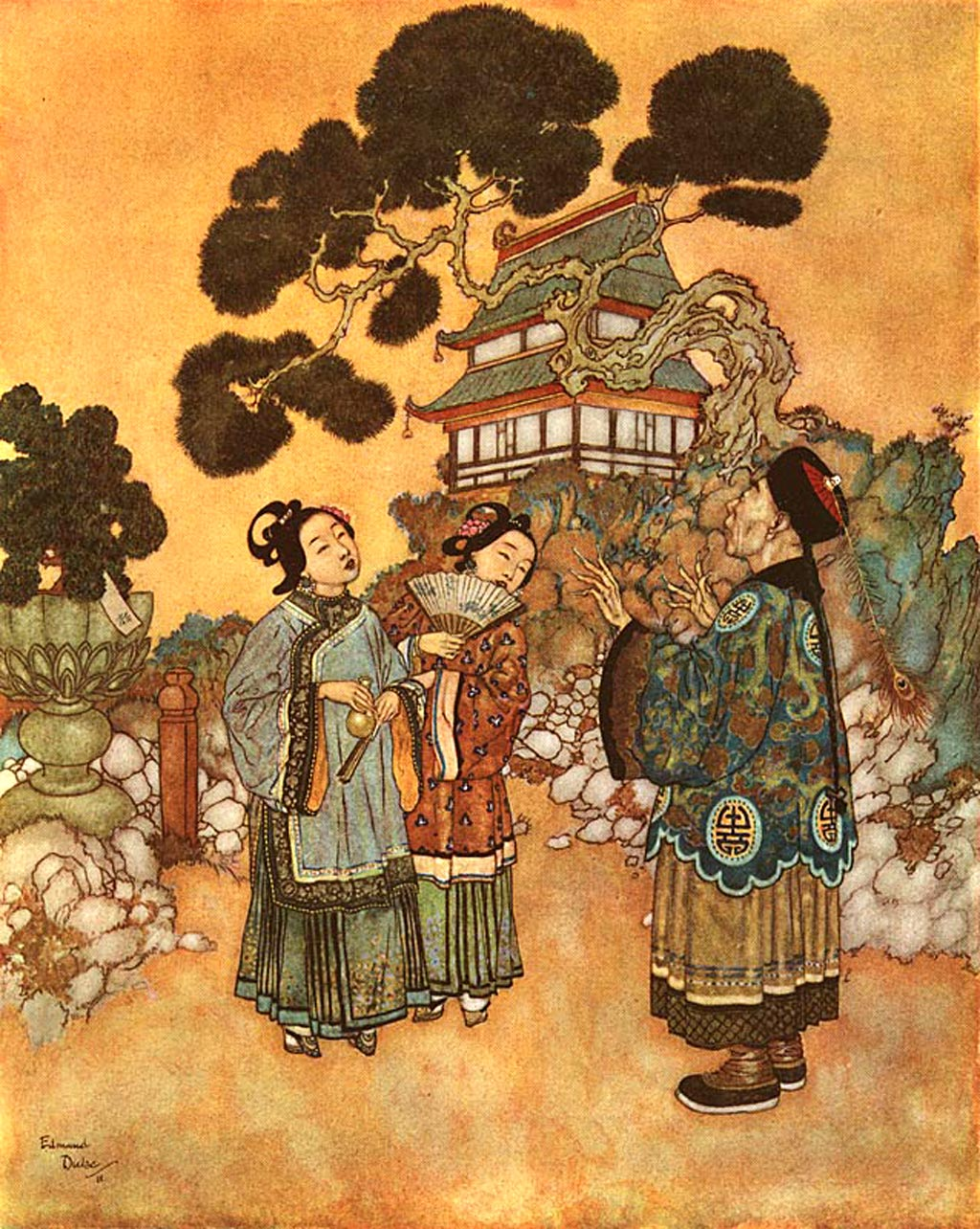
The ladies took some water into their mouths to try and make the same gurgling, thinking so to equal the nightingale.

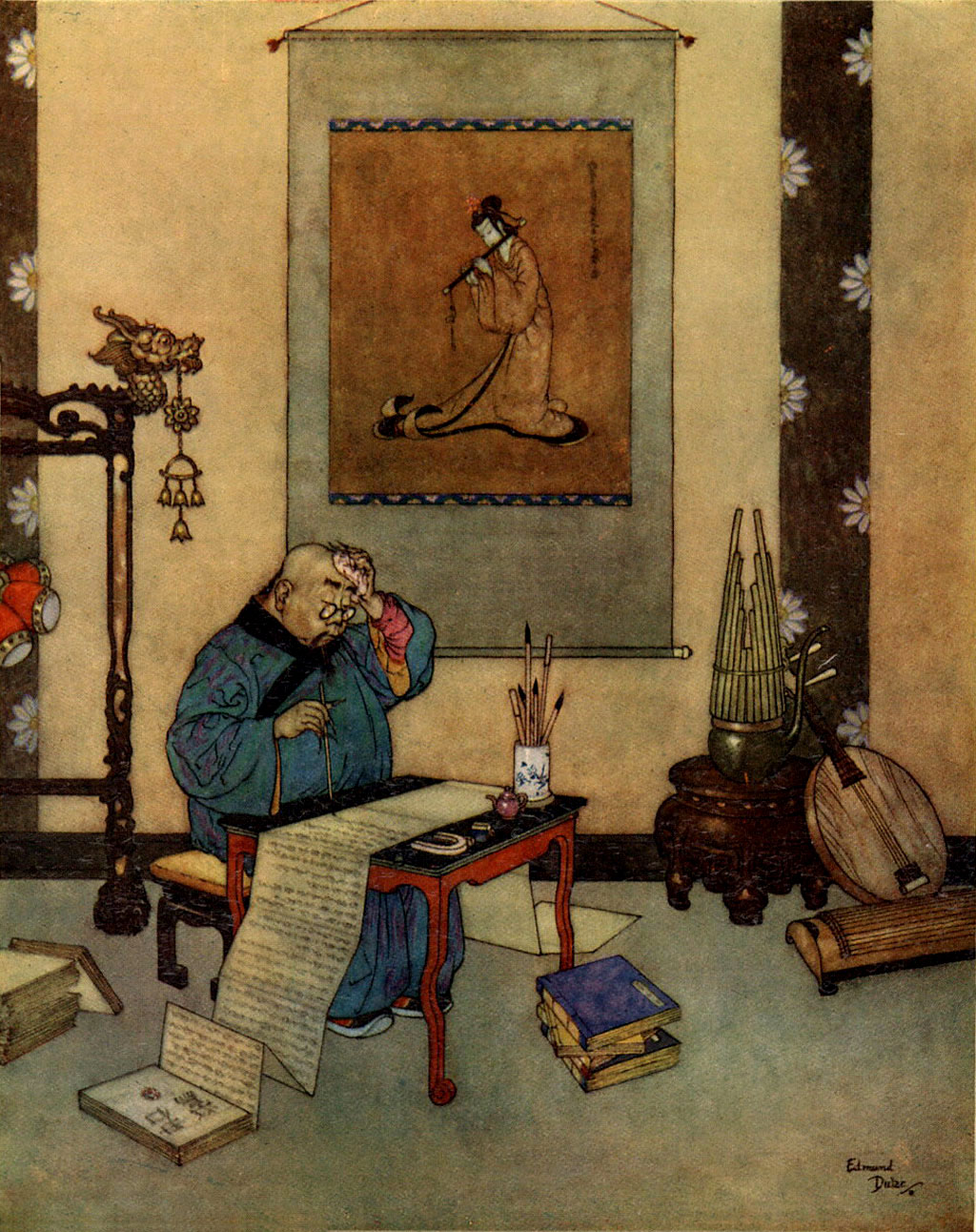
The music-master wrote five-and-twenty volumes about the artificial bird.

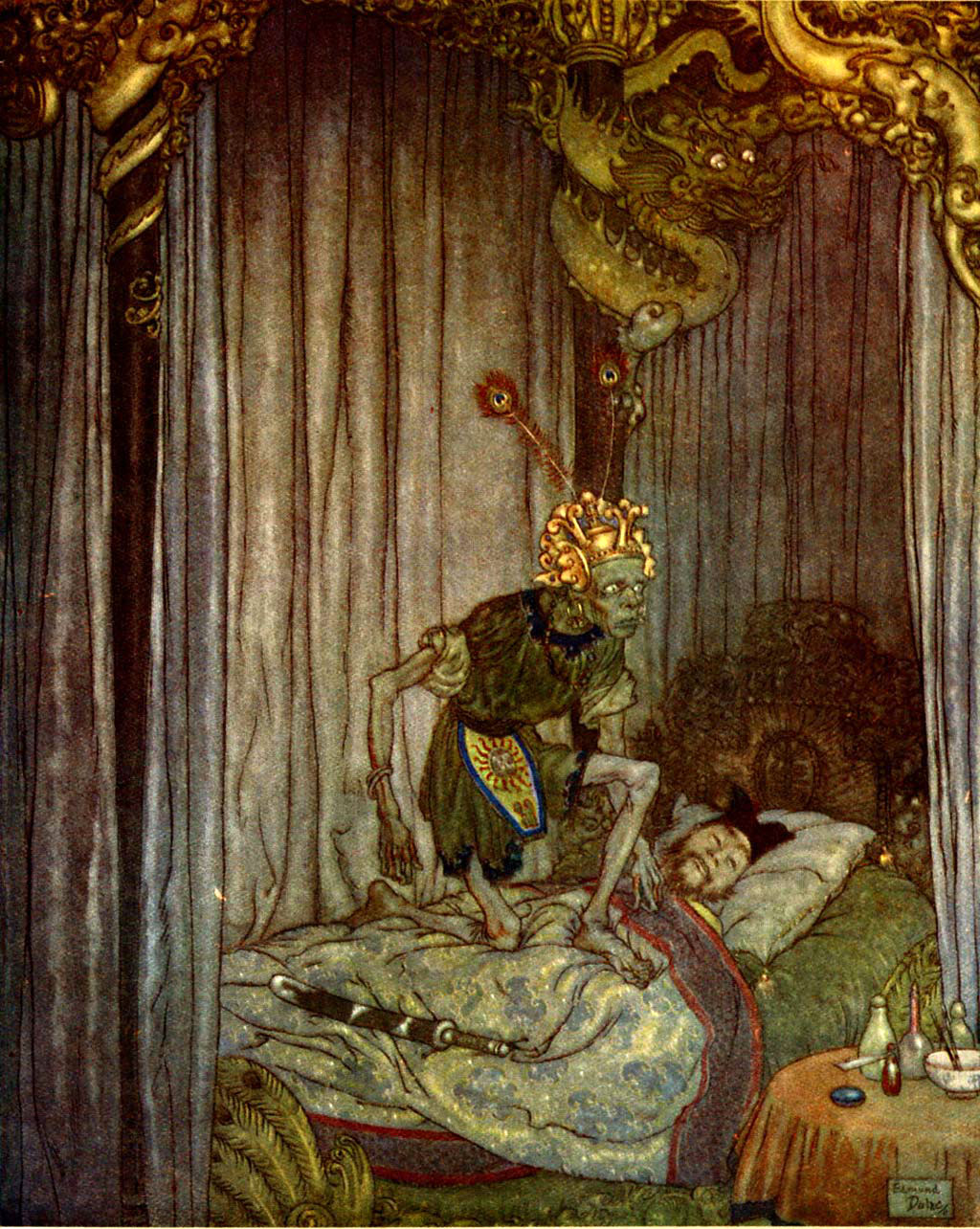
Even Death himself listened to the song and said, 'Go on, little nightingale, go on!'

== Adaptations ==
=== Poetry ===
- Sansom, Clive. "Singer and Nightingale." Return to Magic. Leslie Frewin, 1969.

=== Short stories ===
- Tailor, Dena Bain. "The Nightingale." Little Red Riding Hood in the Big Bad City. DAW, 2004.
- West, Michelle. "The Nightingale" Once Upon a Galaxy edited by William McCarthy and Martin H. Greenberg.

=== Novels ===
- Dalkey, Kara. The Nightingale. Ace, 1991.
- Loftin, Nikki. Nightingale's Nest. Razorbill, 2014.
- Wright, Claire. Skysong. Pantera Press, 2024.

=== Theatre ===
- Giges, Bob. “The Inspiration for Nightingale”.
- MacLellan, Kathy. The Nightingale (puppet show) Rag & Bone Puppet Theatre.

Lazarus, John. “The Nightingale.”

=== Music ===
- Haken, a British progressive-metal band wrote the song “Nightingale” on its album Fauna based on the story.
- Prauliņš, Uģis. Concerto for choir and recorders The Nightingale
- Reynolds, Malvina. The Emperor’s Nightingale (song).
- Rüttgers, Philipp. “The Emperor And The Nightingale -Twists of H.C. Andersen's Untaped Fairy Tales”.
- Shu-bi-dua, a Danish pop group wrote the song “Nattergalen” on their 18th self-titled album, which contained songs based on various H. C. Andersen fairy tales.
- Stravinsky, Igor. Opera: The Nightingale (opera).
- Stravinsky, Igor. Ballet: Le chant du rossignol. Stravinsky original score, Henri Matisse sets, Léonide Massine choreography.
- Strouse, Charles. Nightingale: A New Musical.
- DeSpain, Lisa. Tien, Melisa. Opera: Song of the Nightingale.

=== Films and TV ===
- Faerie Tale Theatre (Showtime) episode The Nightingale (1983) starring Mick Jagger

==== Animated films ====
- Reiniger, Lotte. The Chinese Nightingale. (1927)
- Sporn, Michael. Nightingale. (1992)
- Story Time! Pilot - Extracts from The emperor and the nightingale.
- ToonJet Cartoons. The Emperor's Nightingale.
- Trnka, Jirí and Milos Makovec. The Emperor's Nightingale (1948).
- Xpress English. TV episode; radio play

== General and cited references ==
- Andersen, Hans Christian (1980). Tales and Stories by Hans Christian Andersen. Translated by Conroy, Patricia L.; Rossel, Sven H. Seattle: University of Washington Press.
- Andersen, Hans Christian; Frank, Jeffrey; Frank, Diana Crone (2003). The Stories of Hans Christian Andersen: A New Translation from the Danish. New York: Houghton Mifflin.
- Petri Liukkonen. "Hans Christian Andersen". Books and Writers.
- Celenza, Anna Harwell. Hans Christian Andersen and Music: The Nightingale Revealed. Routledge, 2017.
- Guroian, Vigen. “The Light of the Nightingale: The Gospel Story Resonates Throughout H. C. Andersen's Beloved Tale”.
- H. C. Andersen Centre, The. “Death motif in The Nightingale”
- H. C. Andersen Centre, The. “Religious motifs in The Nightingale”
- "The Nightingale: Editions". Hans Christian Andersen Center.
- Jensen, Lars Bo. "Criticism of Hans Christian Andersen".
- Johansen, Bertil Palmar; Haugan, Asbjørg (1987). "Keiseren og nattergalen". Archived from the original on 23 July 2011.
- Jorgensen, Cecilia (17 March 2005). "Did the Emperor Suffer from Tuberculosis?". Icons of Europe.
- Kramer, Nathaniel. "The Nightingale as Voice Object in H.C. Andersen’s Nattergalen". Scandinavica 52.1 (2013), pp. 42-70.
- Nunnally, Tiina (2005). Fairy Tales. Viking Penguin. ISBN 0-670-03377-4.
- Popova, Maria. "How Hans Christian Andersen Turned His Heartbreak into One of the Most Beloved Fairy Tales of All Time" Brain Pickings
- "Nightingale: Annotated Tale". Sur La Lune.
- Tatar, Maria (2008). The Annotated Hans Christian Andersen. New York and London: W.W. Norton. pp. 78–98. ISBN 978-0-393-06081-2.
- Zipes, Jack. "Hans Christian Andersen and the Discourse of the Dominated". Ch. 5, pp. 79–102 Fairy Tales and the Art of the Subversive.
