= Midnight Sun (ballet) =

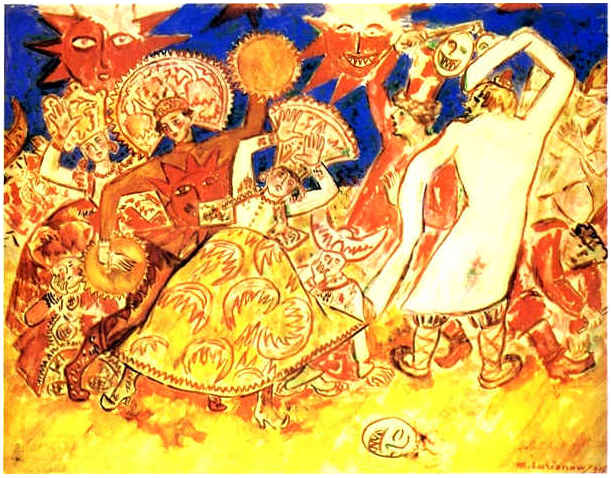
A Group of Dancers and a Mask on the Floor, 1915. Design for Midnight Sun.

Soleil de Nuit (also known by the English title Midnight Sun), was a 1915 ballet by Léonide Massine at the Ballets Russes. It was set to Rimsky-Korsakov's music from The Snow Maiden. Sets and costumes were by Mikhail Larionov.

It was Léonide Massine's first ballet. It used Russian folklore elements.
