= Lubov Tchernicheva =

Russian ballet dancer (1890–1976)

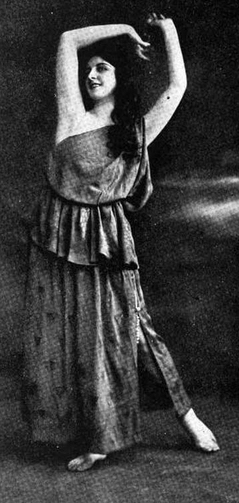
- Lubov Tchernicheva, from a 1915 publication
- Born: September 17, 1890; St. Petersburg
- Died: March 1, 1976 (aged 85); Surrey, England
- Other names: Liubov Pavlovna Chernysheva, Luba Tchernicheva, Lubov Tchernichowa
- Occupation: dancer

Lubov Tchernicheva (Любовь Павловна Чернышёва; 1890–1976) was a Russian ballet dancer. She danced with the Ballets Russes from 1911 to 1929, and continued dancing professionally into her sixties.

== Early life ==
Lubov Pavlovna Tchernicheva was born in St. Petersburg in 1890, and trained there at the Imperial Ballet Academy.

== Career ==
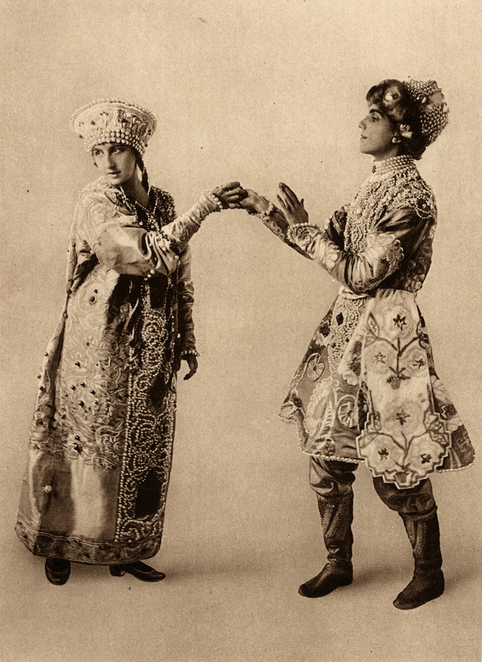
Lubov Tchernicheva and Léonide Massine as the tsarina and the tsarevich in the 1916 production of the Ballets Russes' L'Oiseau de Feu.

Tchernicheva danced with the Mariinsky Ballet from 1908 to 1911, and with the Ballets Russes from 1911 to 1929. She was ballet mistress of the Ballets Russes from 1926 to 1929. She created roles in The Good Humoured Ladies (1917), La Boutique Fantasque (1919), Pulcinella (1920), Les Noces (1924), Les Fâcheux (1924), Zéphire et Flore (1925), Jack-in-the-Box (1926), The Triumph of Neptune (1926), Le Pas d'acier (1927), Apollon musagète (1928), The Gods Go a-Begging (1928), and Francesca da Rimini (1937). In 1932 she became ballet mistress of the Ballet Russe of Monte Carlo, and was active in that organization until it dissolved in 1952. She danced in a revival of Fokine's Thamar at the Metropolitan Opera House in 1935. Her last dancing role was in 1957, at age 66, as Lady Capulet in Romeo and Juliet at La Scala.

In the 1950s, Tchernicheva and her husband produced Russian ballets in London and New York, including a 1954 revival of The Firebird starring Margot Fonteyn and Michael Somes. The couple were jointly honored with the Queen Elizabeth II Coronation Award in 1966, for the services to dance. She continued teaching in England, into the 1970s.

== Personal life ==
Tchernicheva married ballet director Serge Grigoriev in 1909. They had a son, Vsevolod, whose wife Tamara Grigorieva was also a dancer. Tchernicheva was widowed when he died in 1968. She died in 1976 in Richmond, Surrey, England, aged 85 years. Her papers are in the Houghton Library at Harvard University.
