= Albert Schagidullin =

Russian operatic bass-baritone

Albert Schagidullin is a Russian operatic bass-baritone who has appeared in leading roles in many European opera houses and companies, including Glyndebourne Festival Opera, Vienna State Opera, the Liceu (Barcelona), Teatro Real (Madrid), Théâtre du Châtelet (Paris), and La Scala.

He studied at the Moscow Conservatory and won prizes at several international singing competitions: Francisco Viñas Competition in Barcelona (1990), Callas Competition in Athens (1991), Belvedere Competition in Vienna (1991), Vervier Competition (1991), CIEM Competition in Geneva and the Pavarotti Competition in Philadelphia. Schagidullin made his professional debut as Enrico in Lucia di Lammermoor at the Dublin Opera.
