= Le chant du rossignol =

Poème symphonique by Igor Stravinsky

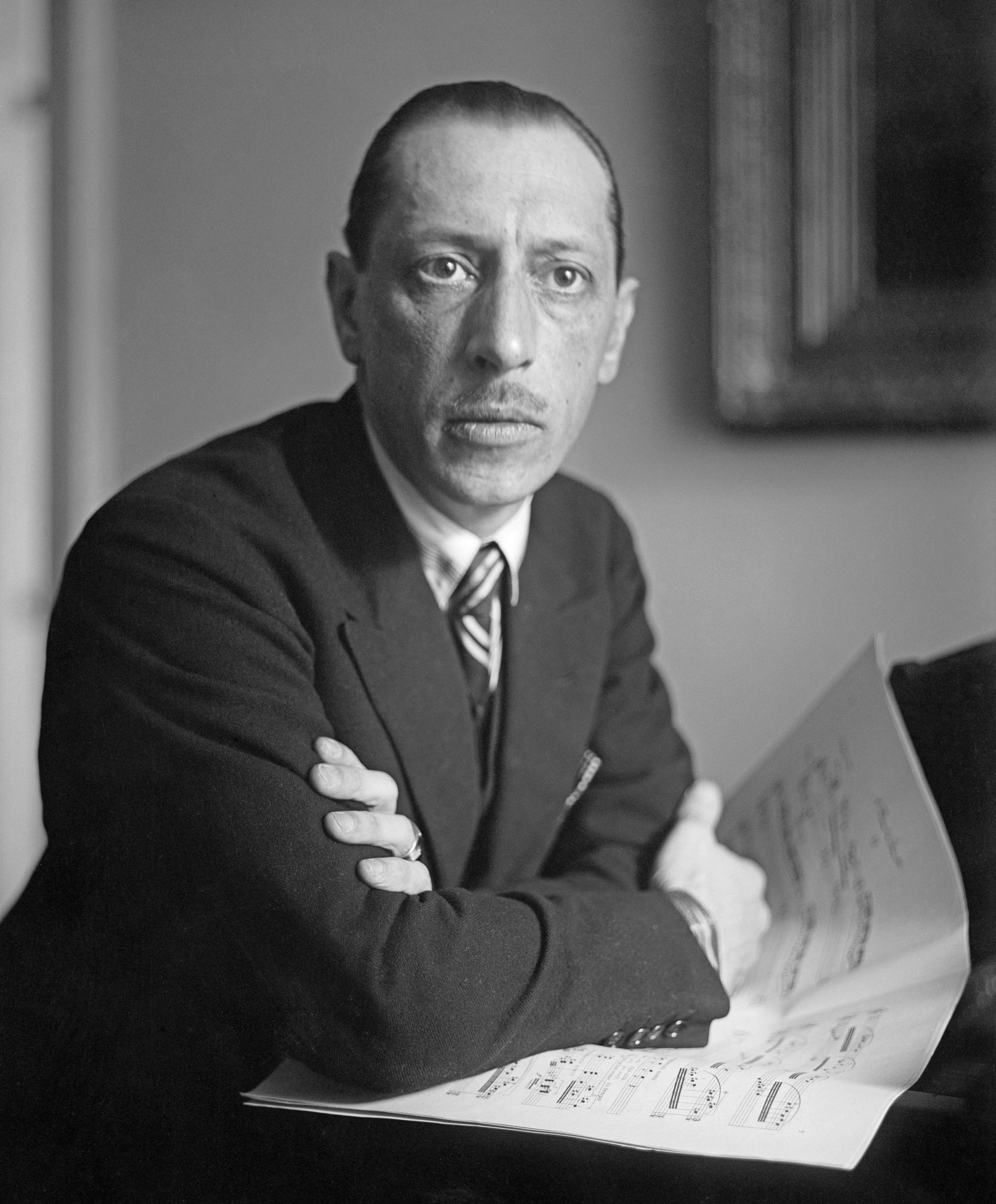
Igor Stravinsky in the 1920s

Chant du Rossignol (English: Song of the Nightingale), as it was published in 1921, is a poème symphonique by Igor Stravinsky adapted in 1917 from his 1914 opera The Nightingale.

== Opera ==
Stravinsky's first opera, The Nightingale was based on Hans Christian Andersen's 1843 fairy tale of the same name and was set to a Russian-language libretto in three acts told from the point of view of a fisherman. The poème symphonique derives its material mostly from the latter two acts, which were completed in 1914 after Stravinsky had established himself as a ballet composer and five years after he had completed the first act. He was in fact unsure about returning to The Nightingale at all, and this doubt may have led him to create the purely instrumental poème symphonique; in his autobiography he writes:

I reached the conclusion — very regretfully, since I was the author of many works for the theatre — that a perfect rendering can be achieved only in the concert hall, because the stage presents a combination of several elements upon which the music has often to depend, so that it cannot rely upon the exclusive consideration which it receives at a concert. I was confirmed in this view when two months later, under the direction of ... [Ernest] Ansermet, Le Chant du Rossignol was given as a ballet by Diaghilev at the Paris Opera.

== Premiere of the poème symphonique ==
The work had its first performance on December 6, 1919, in Geneva, conducted by Ernest Ansermet at the Orchestre de la Suisse Romande. It was met with criticism, much like that of The Rite of Spring. Stravinsky's nontraditional use of dissonance and instruments was unwelcome in later performances of the piece as well. It is possibly due to this public reaction that he then let Diaghilev turn it into a ballet.

== Structure ==
The Chant is divided into four movements of varying length, which follow a non-linear, episodic structure. The music is taken from acts II and III. The movement list is as follows:

1. Presto — Andantino — Tempo I
2. Marche chinoise (Chinese March). = 72 — = 108 sempre
3. Chant du rossignol (Song of the Nightingale). Cadenza — Adagio — Presto — Vivace
4. Jeu du rossignol mécanique (The Mechanical Nightingale). Moderato — Sempre = 60 — Molto ritmico — Pianissimo — Tranquillo

== Premiere as a choreographed ballet ==
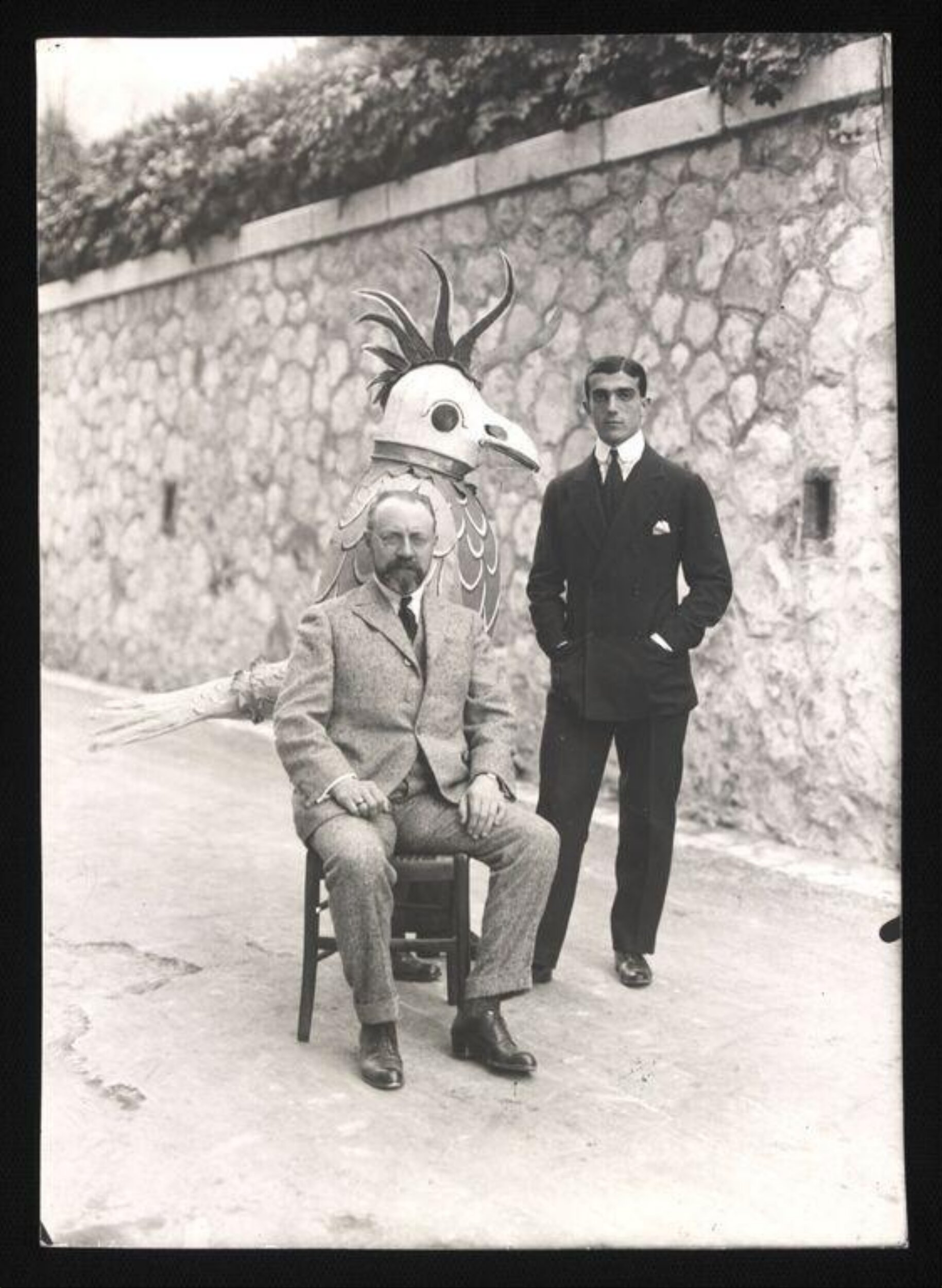
Henri Matisse and Léonide Massine preparing the ballet Le chant du rossignol (debut February 2, 1920) with the mechanical Nightingale

=== Productions ===
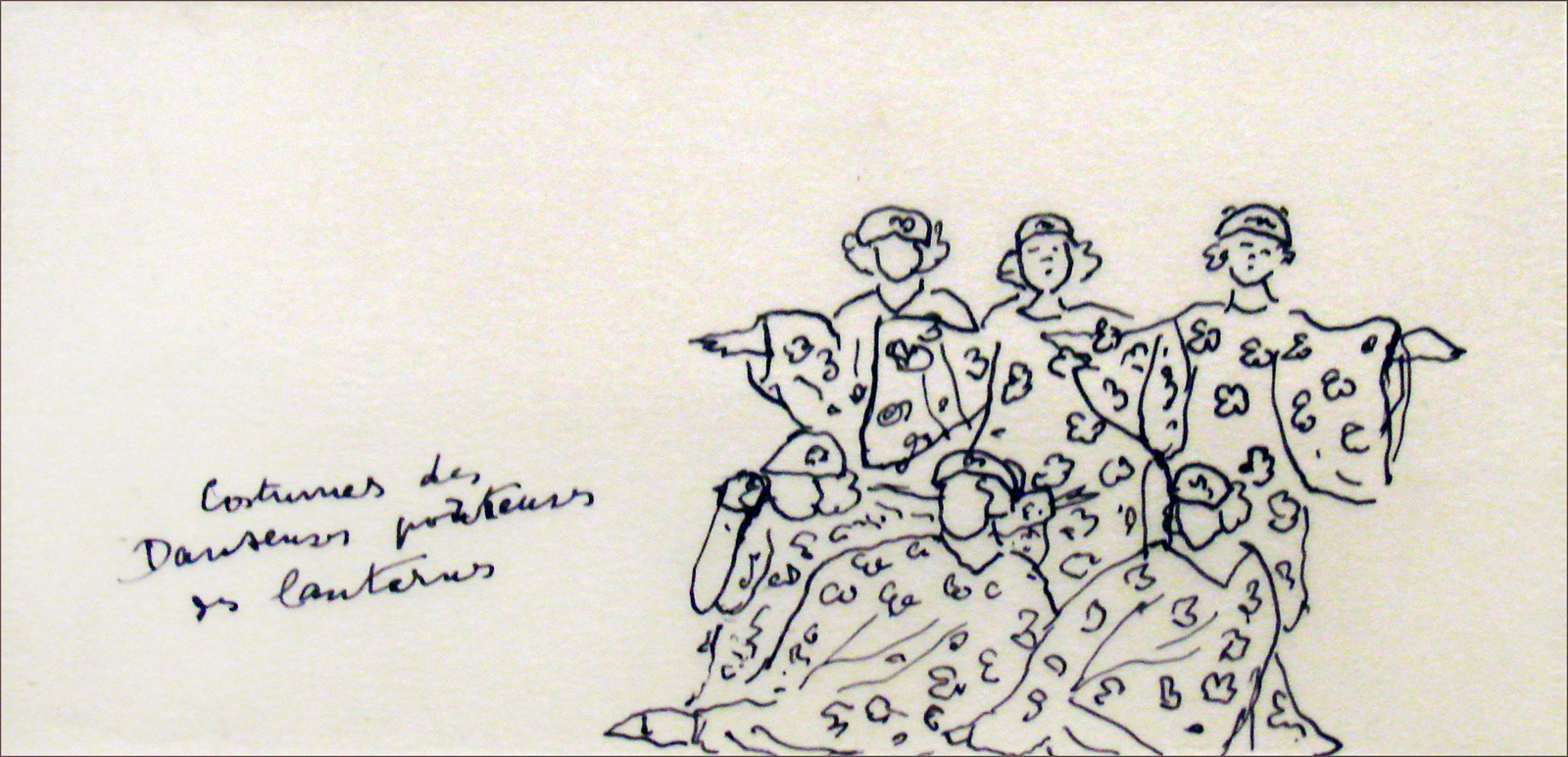
Costume design by Henri Matisse for Le Chant du Rossignol

The piece's ballet debut occurred on February 2, 1920, at the Théâtre National de l'Opéra in Paris. The choreography was by Leonid Massine and designs by Henri Matisse. This also was met with some skepticism; Stravinsky himself was not entirely pleased. "I had destined Le Chant du Rossignol for the concert platform, and a choreographic rendering seemed to me to be quite unnecessary," he says later in his autobiography.

Stravinsky agreed to do a revival of the ballet in 1925. Originally, the choreography was to be Massine's, but when that fell through, Diaghilev chose one of his newest students, George Balanchine, to choreograph the ballet. This is when Stravinsky first met Balanchine, who later became his most important creative partner.

The Diaghilev and Stravinsky relationship weakened during Le chant du rossignol, as each liked to be the director in charge. As Balanchine was allowed more of a role, however, it was clear that the Balanchine-Stravinsky relationship was a lasting one. They had similar taste in art, music, and movement and lived to create. Stravinsky and Balanchine continued as a team for several years, creating a number of famous ballets.

=== Plot ===
The ballet follows the main plot line of Stravinsky's Le rossignol, based on Andersen's The Nightingale. The first scene shows the Nightingale singing (or in this case, dancing) for the Emperor of China, who is pleased. In the music, the song of the nightingale is chromatic and swooping, it sounds free and natural, like the song of a bird. The second scene introduces the gift of the mechanical nightingale from the Emperor of Japan. All are mesmerized by its song and ignore the real Nightingale, who flies away. The music here is short and clear, without the smooth runs of the "real" Nightingale and more sounds of a mechanical automaton.

In the third scene, the Emperor meets Death, due to illness and suffering from having lost the nightingale. Then the Nightingale appears outside the Emperor's window and convinces Death to let the Emperor go. The final scene shows the courtiers discovering that the Emperor is now well, although his Nightingale leaves once again, returning to nature.

=== Themes ===
The story's themes include the natural versus the artificial, with the real Nightingale juxtaposed with its mechanical replacement. This was not the first (or last) piece by Stravinsky centered on the character of a bird, nor was it his first fascination with a seemingly perfect machine, as records tell us Stravinsky often preferred the sound of a mechanical pianola, to the human (and inevitably imperfect) performance on a real piano.

=== Movement with music ===
Tamara Karsavina with dancers. Costume designs by Henri Matisse, 1920

Stravinsky was always specific about the use of movement with music. He once said, "I do not see how one can be a choreographer unless, like Balanchine, one is a musician first", in praise of the famous choreographer who began working with Stravinsky for the revival of Le chant du rossignol. Balanchine was in fact a musician himself, and already a fan of Stravinsky's work. He was immediately willing to take the challenge, saying, "I learned the music well, and so ... when Diaghilev asked me to stage Stravinsky's ballet Le chant du rossignol, I was able to do it quickly".

== Arrangements ==
=== Solo piano ===
Stravinsky also wrote a reduction of the whole symphonic poem for solo piano. As opposed to the original four-movement version for orchestra finished in 1917, the version for solo piano consists of three movements, with the full original material intact but rearranged into different movement division. The movement list is as follows:

1. La fête au palais de l'empereur de Chine (Celebration in the Chinese Emperor's Palace). Presto — Andantino — Allegro — Marche chinoise
2. Les deux Rossignols (The Two Nightingales). Cadenza — Adagio — Presto — Vivace — Jeu du Rossignol mécanique. Moderato — Pochissimo più largo. Maestoso — Larghetto
3. Maladie et guérison de l'empereur de Chine (The Chinese Emperor's Illness and Recovery). Molto ritmico — Marche funèbre — Larghetto

The piece was published by Hawkes & Son in 1927.

== Recording ==
Stravinsky did not record the music during his extensive recording sessions for Columbia Records, other than a 1932 reduction for violin and piano of Airs du rossignol and Marche chinoise only, recorded in 1933 with Samuel Dushkin on violin. However, Fritz Reiner and the Chicago Symphony Orchestra recorded the ballet for RCA Victor in "Living Stereo," a pioneering process using triple track tape recorders and three microphones, in Chicago's Orchestra Hall. It was among RCA's first recordings to be released in stereo, in 1958.
