= Xenia Makletzova =

Russian ballet dancer (1892–1974)

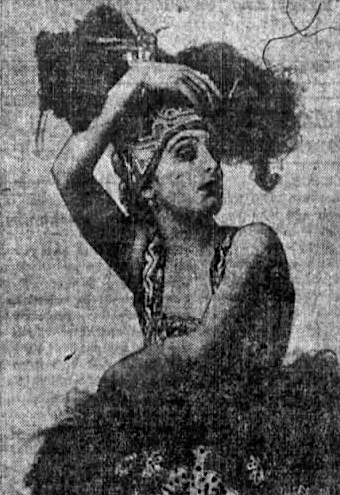
- Xenia Makletzova, from a 1916 publication
- Born: 6 November 1892; St. Petersburg, Russian Empire
- Died: May 18, 1974 (aged 81); Long Beach, New York

Xenia Makletzova (6 November 1892 – 18 May 1974), sometimes seen as Xenia Maclezova, was a Russian ballet dancer.

== Early life ==
Xenia Petrovna Makletzova was born in St. Petersburg. She trained as a dancer at the Bolshoi Ballet School, graduating in 1908.

== Career ==
Makletzova joined the Mariinsky Ballet in 1913. In 1915–1916 she was prima ballerina of Sergei Diaghilev's Ballets Russes on its first tour of the United States. She was in the United States premiere of Les Sylphides with the Diaghilev company. She was fired for insubordination by Diaghilev, after she refused to add another ballet to her repertoire or dance with Alexander Gavriloff, without an increase in her pay. She was replaced with Lydia Lopokova. Diaghilev sued, but Makletzova countersued, and she was awarded $4,500 by a jury in Massachusetts. She appeared in court with her mother, and wearing jewelry said to be given to her by the Czar. Her testimony in court was translated, as she did not speak English at the time.

She returned to the Mariinsky in 1917, but soon revolutionary tumult meant she had to leave Russia. She toured in Asia for several years, then joined Mikhail Mordkin's short-lived Russian Ballet Company in the United States in 1926. In 1928, she toured with the Alexis Kosloff Ballet, and she appeared in a production of Scheherazade at Carnegie Hall. She was still with Kosloff in 1930, when she was a featured performer at the Doge's Ball in Miami, Florida.

Carl Van Vechten admired the dancer's technical skill, saying "I have forgotten how many times Mlle. Maclezova could pirouette without touching the toe in the air to the floor, but it was some prodigious number." However, he found her lacking in "grace, poetry, and imagination", and judged that Makletzova "really offended the eye" in The Firebird. "Far from interpreting the ballet," he concluded, "she gave you an idea of how it should not be done."

== Personal life ==
Makletzova died in Long Beach, New York, in 1974, aged 81 years.
