= Ludmilla Schollar =

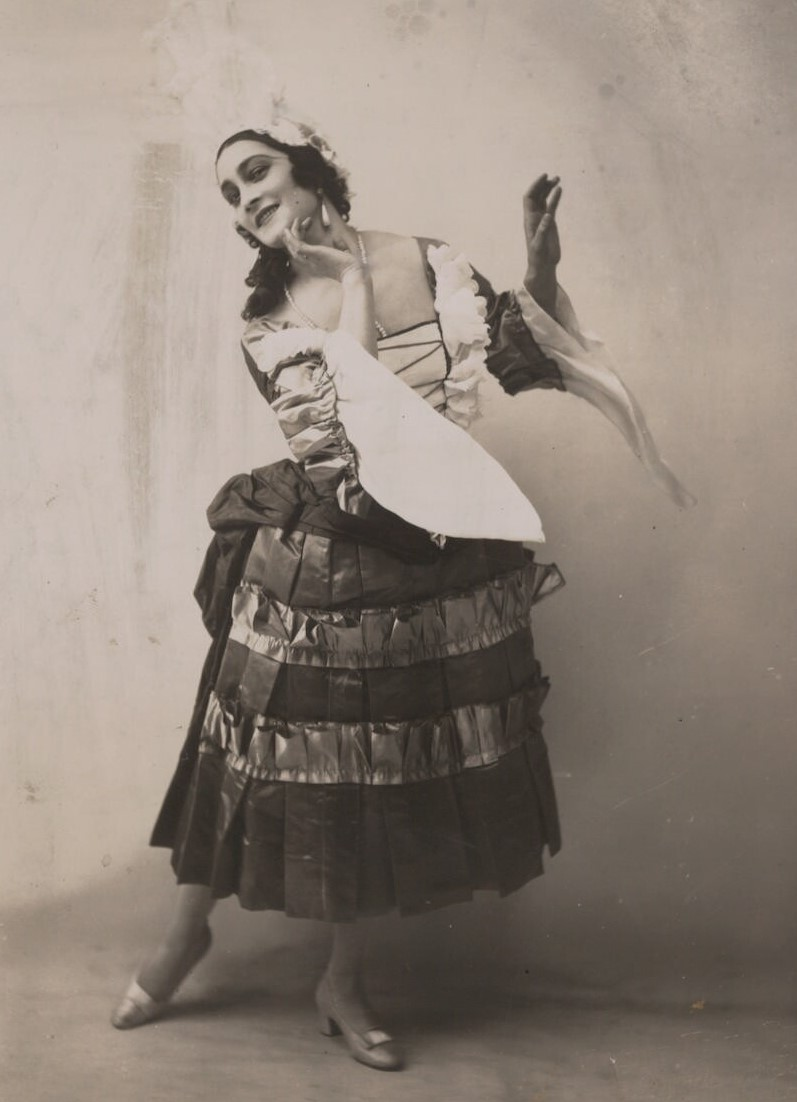
- Born: Lyudmila Frantzevna Shollar; March 15, 1888; St Petersburg, Russia
- Died: July 10, 1978 (aged 90); San Francisco, California, United States
- Occupations: Dancer, dance teacher
- Spouse: Anatole Vilzak

Ludmilla Frantzevna Schollar (Russian: Людми́ла Францевна (Фёдоровна) Шоллар March 15, 1888 – July 10, 1978) was a Russian-American dancer and educator.

== Biography ==
Born Lyudmila Frantzevna Shollar in Saint Petersburg, Schollar attended the Imperial Theatre School there. She studied with Enrico Cecchetti and Michel Fokine. Upon graduation in 1906, she joined the Mariinsky Ballet. She performed with the ballet until 1914 and then again from 1917 to 1921. Schollar was a member of Sergei Diaghilev's Ballets Russes from 1909 to 1914 and from 1921 to 1925.

She appeared in leading roles in ballets by Fokine such as Carnaval, Petrushka and Scheherazade. She also performed in Nijinsky's Jeux and Diaghilev's The Sleeping Princess.

During World War I, she served as a nurse with the Red Cross; she was wounded and received the George Medal.

Schollar married the dancer Anatole Vilzak. In 1925, Schollar and Vilzak left the Ballets Russes and joined the Teatro Colón in Argentina. In 1928, she became principal dancer in Ida Rubinstein's company.

She taught ballet in New York City from 1935 to 1963, notably at the School of American Ballet and at her own school. Scholler and her husband subsequently moved to Washington, where they taught at the Washington School of Ballet. In 1965, they began teaching at the San Francisco Ballet School; she retired from the school's faculty in 1977.

Schollar died at the age of 90 at the Marshall Hale Memorial Hospital in San Francisco.
