= Pavel Dmitriyevich Lvov =

Russian aristocrat (1864–1919)

Prince Pavel Dmitriyevich Lvov
- Павел Дмитриевич Львов
- Prince Pavel Dmitriyevich Lvov in 1898
- Born: 1864
- Died: 1919 (reported)
- Occupations: Civil servant, patron of ballet
- Known for: Patronage of Vaslav Nijinsky
- Parents: Dmitry Alexandrovich Lvov (father); Alexandra Pavlovna Alexandrova (mother)

Prince Pavel Dmitriyevich Lvov (Russian: Павел Дмитриевич Львов; 1864 – reportedly 1919) was a Russian aristocrat, civil servant and patron of ballet. He was a patron and lover of the dancer Vaslav Nijinsky, whom he introduced to Sergei Diaghilev. A historical account published by the Saratov diocese identifies him among those executed in Saratov in September 1919.

== Family and education ==
Lvov was born in 1864, the younger son of Prince Dmitry Alexandrovich Lvov and Alexandra Pavlovna Alexandrova. His father held appointments at the imperial court. His mother was a granddaughter of Grand Duke Konstantin Pavlovich of Russia, through Pavel Konstantinovich Alexandrov.

He attended the Page Corps. A published list of its graduates records him in the class of 11 August 1886, leaving with the civil rank of collegiate registrar.

Portrait of Prince Pavel Dmitrievich Lvov by the artist Georges Becker, late 19th – early 20th century (no later than 1909)

Prince Pavel Dmitrievich Lvov upon graduating from the Imperial Corps of Pages in 1886.

== Civil service ==
According to Lev Sokolinsky, Lvov joined the Ministry of Ways of Communication in 1900 as an official for special assignments. In 1905 he worked in the ministry's property-expropriation department. He became a titular councillor in 1906, a collegiate assessor in 1907 and a court councillor in 1911. Sokolinsky records his continued employment in the ministry through 1916.

== Personal life ==
An undated police memorandum, placed by its editors between late 1890 and 1894, mentions a 28-year-old "Prince Lvov" and alleges that he had sexual relations with soldiers. Lev Sokolinsky identifies this man as Pavel Dmitriyevich Lvov. The original entry supplies neither a first name nor a patronymic and does not identify any individual partners.

According to his relative Nikolai Vyrubov, Lvov maintained a home in Paris and took family portraits there in the late nineteenth century. Vyrubov's father subsequently occupied the apartment, where the paintings remained.

=== Relationship with Vaslav Nijinsky ===
In 1907, Lvov began a relationship with Vaslav Nijinsky, having been introduced to him by a fellow dancer. He became both the dancer's lover and financial supporter. Nijinsky's mother welcomed the relationship and appreciated Lvov's assistance.

Bronislava Nijinska remembered Lvov as tall and dark-haired, with a small moustache, and described his manner as tactful and friendly. In diary passages reproduced by Sokolinsky, Nijinsky recalled Lvov's love poems and his own wish that they could remain together.

Lvov also socialised with Nijinsky's mother and sister, inviting them to concerts, giving them presents and taking them on motoring excursions. During an illness suffered by Nijinsky, he arranged medical assistance and attended to him.

His interests included sport, motoring and theatre. According to the dance historian Hanna Järvinen, Lvov taught Nijinsky to play tennis. Järvinen suggests that these experiences may have helped associate the sport with modern life in Nijinsky's imagination, a connection subsequently explored in his ballet Jeux (1913).

In late 1908, Lvov introduced Nijinsky to Sergei Diaghilev, who became the dancer's next lover and patron. In his diary, as discussed by Joan Acocella, Nijinsky stated that Lvov had encouraged the new relationship because he believed Diaghilev could further his career.

== Historical possessions ==
Lvov owned a sabre blade associated with Peter the Great, subsequently held by the Military Historical Museum of Artillery, Engineers and Signal Corps in Saint Petersburg. Efimov describes an inscription recording its passage from Emperor Paul I to Grand Duke Konstantin Pavlovich and, by inheritance, to Lvov. The blade entered the museum's collection during the 1920s or 1930s.

Headstone on the mass grave at the Voskresenskoye Cemetery in Saratov with Prince Lvov name on it

== After the Bolshevik Revolution ==
Accounts of Lvov's fate after the Bolshevik Revolution of 1917 are conflicting. According to one account, he disappeared after 1917, and members of the Vyrubov family subsequently obtained a judicial declaration that he was missing, enabling them to inherit his Paris apartment.

A list of 28 people sentenced to death by the Saratov Cheka on 29 September 1919 includes a man named Prince Pavel Dmitriyevich Lvov, described as a former landowner. According to Maxim Plyakin and Valery Teplov, the prisoners were executed on 30 September near the city's Resurrection Cemetery; their account cites the Saratov Soviet newspaper of 2 October 1919. Lev Sokolinsky identifies the executed man as Nijinsky's former patron. However, other accounts give the executed man's birth year as 1878 and describe him as married with four children. These details would require reconciliation with the identification of the prisoner as the prince born in 1864.

A different account appears in Bronislava Nijinska's memoirs. Nijinska recalled that, while working in London after the revolution, she asked Sergei Diaghilev about Lvov. Diaghilev replied that he believed the prince was living in Edinburgh and serving as president of a prominent sporting society.

According to an account of her interrogation following her arrest in 1935, the widow of Lvov's brother Alexander stated that she had no information about her husband's relatives and believed that they were living abroad.

The historian S. V. Efimov gives Lvov's death year as 1919 with a question mark.
