= Suvretta House =

Luxury hotel in Switzerland

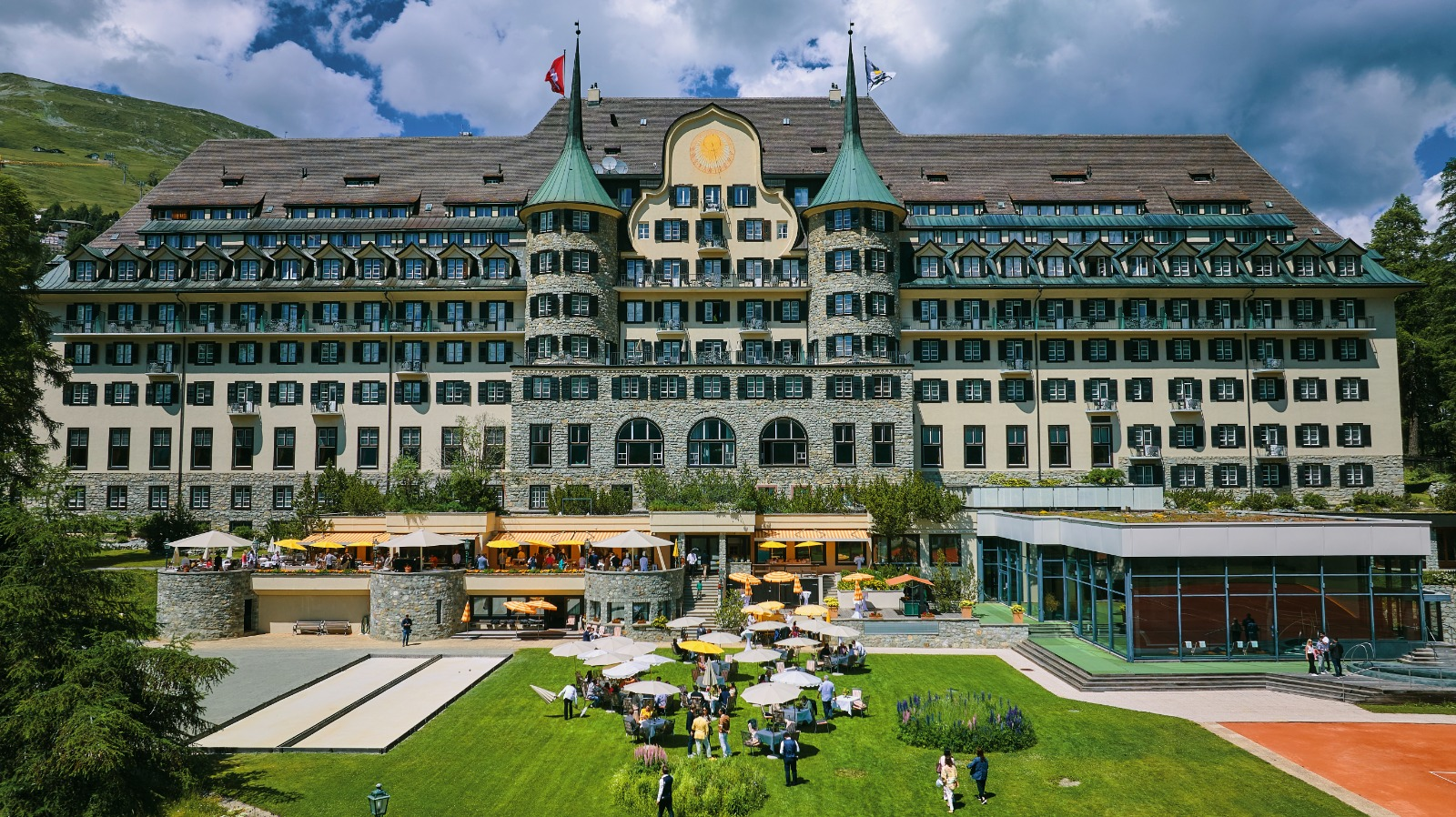
- The hotel in 2023
- Interactive map of the Suvretta House area

General information
- Type: Luxury hotel
- Location: St. Moritz, Switzerland
- Coordinates: 46°29′4.7″N 9°49′12.45″E
- Groundbreaking: 22 April 1911
- Opening: 16 December 1912
- Affiliation: The Leading Hotels of the World

Other information
- Number of rooms: 181
- Number of suites: 10

Website
- suvrettahouse.ch

Suvretta House is a five-star luxury hotel in St. Moritz, Switzerland. Opened in 1912, it is part of The Leading Hotels of the World. It features 181 rooms and several restaurants. Suvretta translates to "house above the woods", and it was built by hotelier Anton Bon. It is St Moritz's only ‘ski-in’ and ‘ski-out’ hotel.

== History ==
=== Earliest history ===
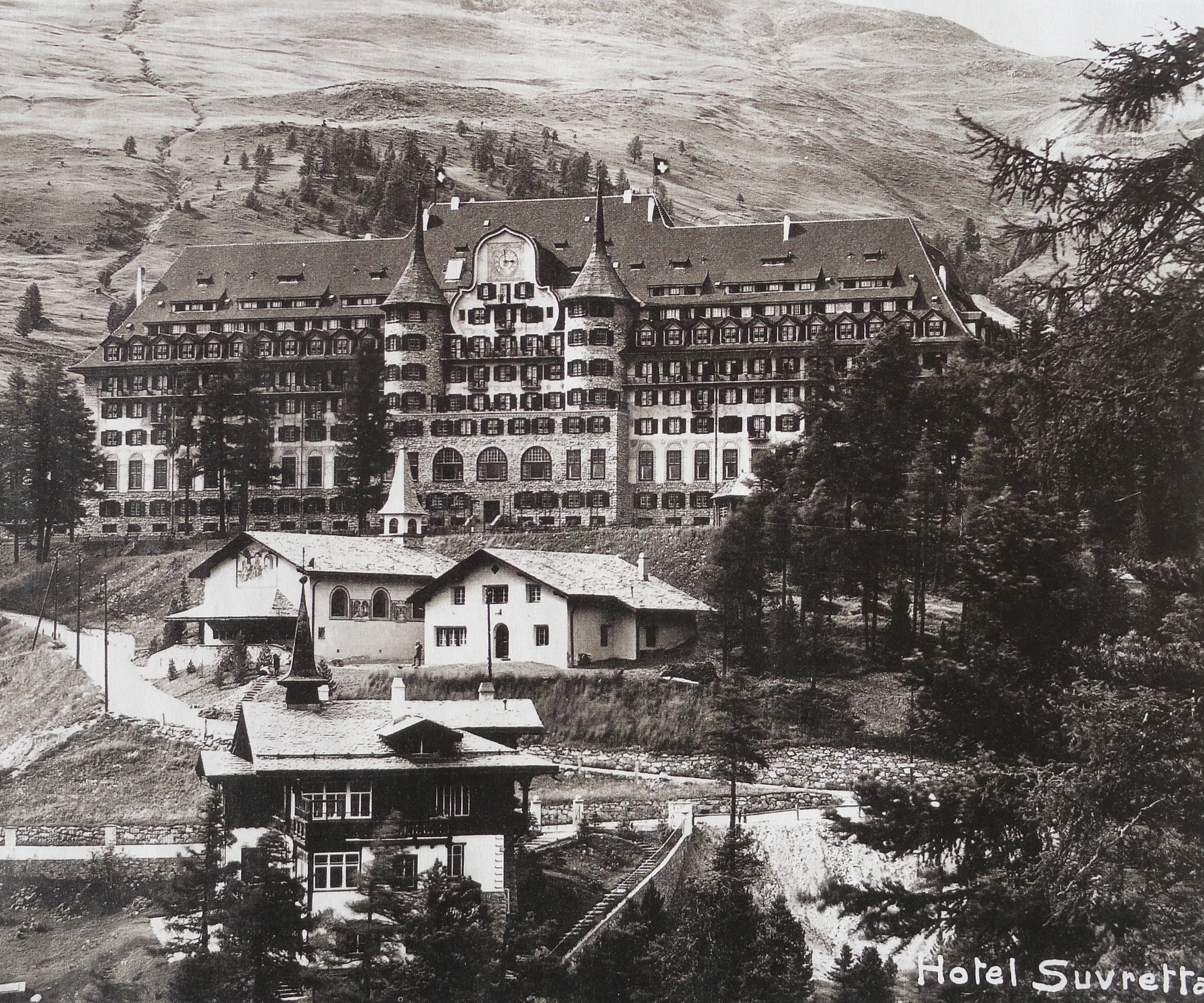
Suvretta House in 1913

The history of Suvretta House dates back to the beginning of the 20th century, when an English shipbuilder had the "Villa Suvretta" built for his wife by Swiss architect Karl Koller. However, his wife didn't like the villa, and he sold it to his friend, Charles Sydney Goldman, a British Member of Parliament and businessman who had made a fortune trading in diamonds. Goldman admired the house and gradually bought 4.5 hectares of surrounding land.

Goldman met Swiss hotelier Anton Bon, and they both agreed on building a new hotel. The groundbreaking ceremony took place on 22 April 1911. According to the hotel, the cornerstone was laid on 22 April 1911, with the hotel erected over the next year and a half. It was inaugurated on 16 December 1912, with 200 invited guests. The interior had been created in 1912.

The hotel had 370 beds, 250 rooms, 110 bathrooms, and rooms for bridge and billiards when it first opened. It also had a library, rooms for smoking and tea, a music salon, and "several interconnected banquet and dining rooms." Marie Bon co-ran the hotel until Anton Bon died in 1915, after which "it was Marie who helped to give the Suvretta its distinct atmosphere of old world charm matched by the polished nickel heights of modern luxury comforts." In 1916, her son, Hans Bon (1882-1950) was appointed as the new director.

In 1919, Russian ballet dancer Vaslav Nijinsky took his final bow at Suvretta House Hotel. The Australian ballet work Nijinsky opened " in the ballroom of the Suvretta House Hotel," marking Nijinsky's last public performance, which Nijinsky called his "wedding with God." Notable guests have included King Farouk of Egypt, Crown Prince Akihito, the Shah of Persia, Gregory Peck, and Evita Perón.

=== Later generations ===
In 1935, one of the first ski lifts in Switzerland was inaugurated at the Suvretta. It led from Suvretta to Randolins. Actor Douglas Fairbanks was the first person to use the lift. The lift made it possible to reach the Corviglia ski area directly from the hotel. The hotel was closed from 1941 to 1946 as a result of World War II. Later, renovation work was carried out. In 1963, Suvretta House acquired additional land to protect downhill slopes from building developments.

The hotel has been owned by multiple generations of the Bon family. In 1968, management changed to Dorli and Rudolf F Muller. During renovations and expansions, it has had a swimming pool and spa added, as well as a winter ski room, and an electronic games room. One renovation was completed at the end of 2017, and that year the hotel won the Prix Bienvenu of the Swiss Tourism Association. In 2018, it was still managed and owned by the extended Bon/Candrian family, specifically by Esther and Peter Egli. They had taken it over from Helen and Vic Jacob in 2014, who in turn had managed the resort since 1989. Peter and Esther Egli continued to manage the Suvretta House in 2018. After Peter and Esther Egli took over, features such as more sporting facilities, "yoga on snow," ice hockey, cross country skiing, and a children's ski school. A house gin brand, Lady's and Gentleman's Gin, was added.

== Features ==
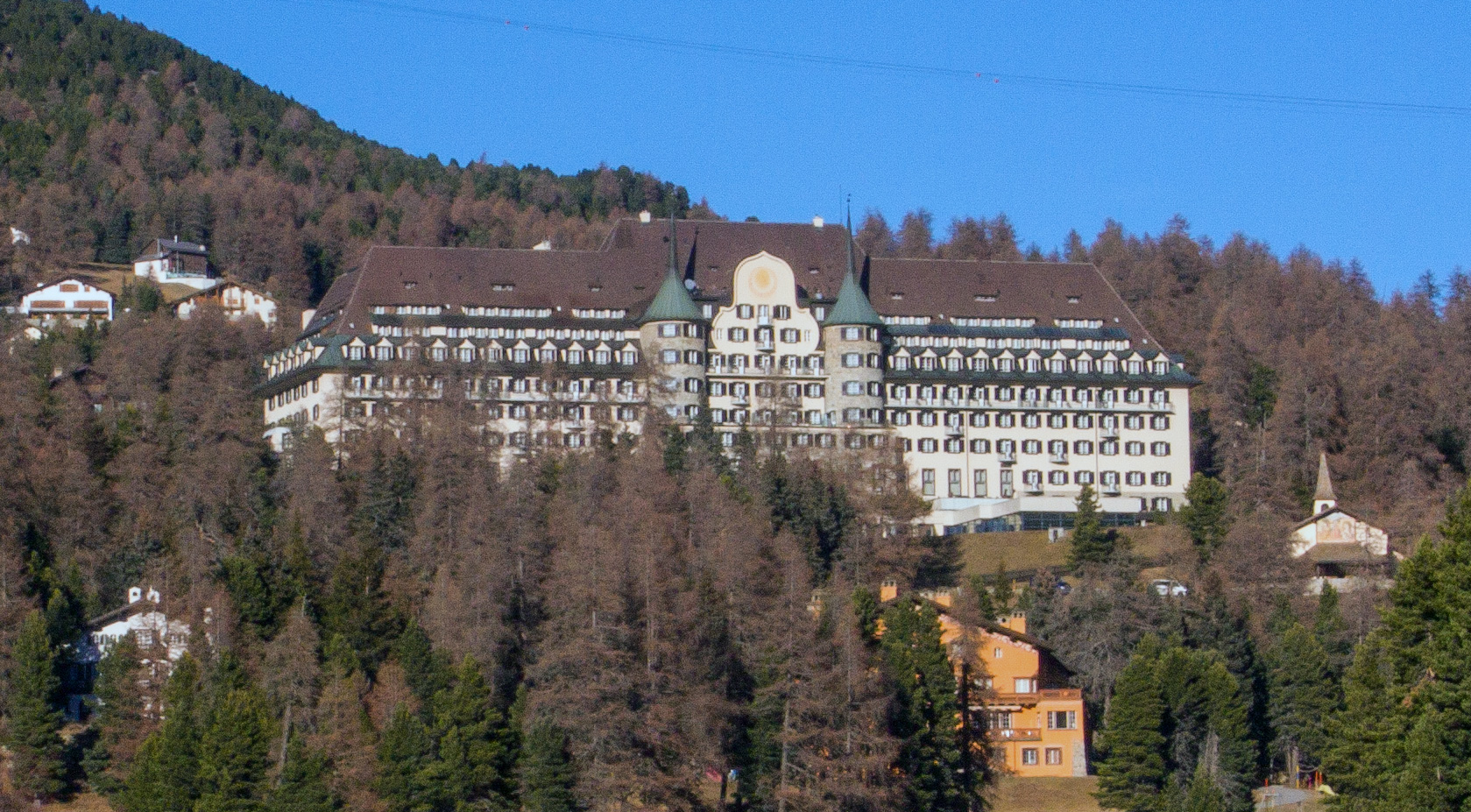
View of the hotel from the south

The building has six floors. In 2022, it had 171 rooms and 10 suites, equaling 181 total units, and is about a mile outside of town. There is a Belle Époque exterior. During 2017, a renovation was completed by UK interior designer Sue Freeman. The 181 rooms and suites face all directions around the building. Business Traveler described an "unusual" but "generous amount of wardrobe space," with the larger rooms "set up to encourage longer stays and the amount of clothes you would need."

The resort is not open year-round – instead, it opens in early December and closes in early April. It opens again in late June, then closes in early September. The resort has daily guided activities, such as "Nordic walks," sailing, golfing, yoga, and pilates. There are three tennis courts which become an ice rink in winter. There is an indoor pool, a wellness center, and an outdoor Jacuzzi. There is a 25-meter indoor pool, and an outdoor hot-tub, and a spa. An adult's-only area has an "icy plunge pool" as well as saunas and steam rooms. 45 of the 181 rooms have balconies. There are a number of shops on the bottom level.

=== Skiing ===
It is St Moritz's only ‘ski-in’ and ‘ski-out’ hotel. Conde Nast Traveller described it as "completely isolated" in the mountains. The Trutz Chalet restaurant is at 7,200 feet above sea level, and can be reached by a ski lift. The resort has a private ski lift, with Suvretta as the sole "ski-in/ski-out hotel" in St. Moritz. It also has an on-site ski shop. All guests are given private lockers for skiing.

=== Restaurants ===
According to Spears, at Le Grand, "architect Karl Koller designed the dining room to be vast and long, with a decorated ‘cassette ceiling’, honey oak paneling and carved supporting pillars" which evoked the "great ocean liner age of the 1920s and 30s." In 2018, it required a jacket and tie, the suits having been dropped around 2014.

The Grand Restaurant requires formal dress, and there are two mountain restaurants within walking distance associated with the resort. As of 2018, the hotel had several restaurants. The Grand Restaurant had a dress code, while there was also the Suvretta Stube for breakfasts and other meals. The two mountain restaurants include the Restaurant Chasellas, which opens at lunchtime and dinner for hikers. Higher up is the Trutz, another mountain restaurant.

At the main hotel on the ground floor, Anton's Bar stays open late.

== See also ==
- List of hotels in Switzerland
- Tourism in Switzerland
