= Vaslav Nijinsky =

Russian dancer and choreographer (1889–1950)

- Вацлав Нижинский
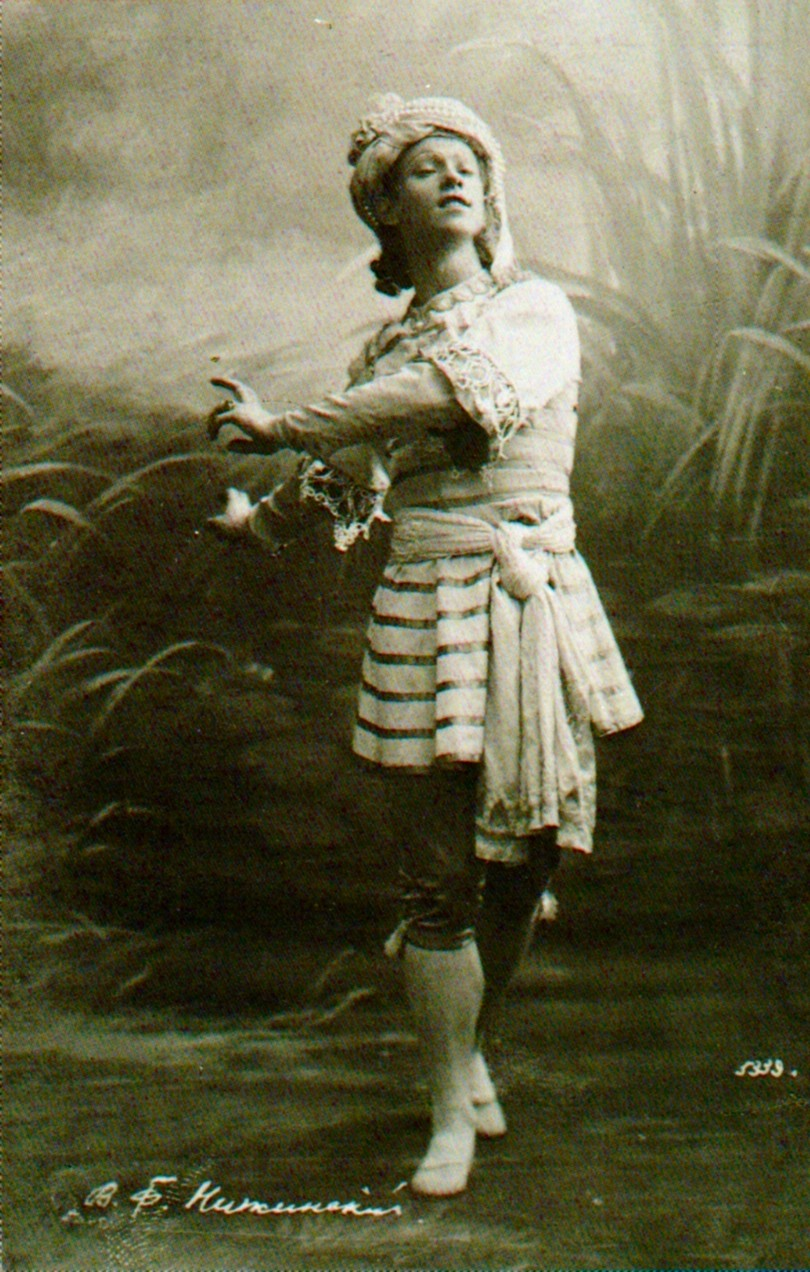
- Nijinsky as Vayou in Nikolai Legat's revival of Marius Petipa's The Talisman, St. Petersburg, 1909
- Born: Wacław Niżyński; 12 March 1889/1890; Kiev, Russian Empire
- Died: 8 April 1950 (aged 60–61); London, England
- Other name: Vatslav Nijinsky
- Occupations: Ballet dancer; choreographer
- Years active: 1908–1917
- Spouse: Romola de Pulszky (m. 1913)
- Children: 2

Vaslav or Vatslav Fomich Nijinsky (Note: /ˌvɑːtslɑːf nɪˈ(d)ʒɪnski/; Russian: Вацлав Фомич Нижинский, romanized: Vatslav Fomich Nizhinsky, IPA: [ˈvatsləf fɐˈmʲitɕ nʲɪˈʐɨnskʲɪj]; Polish: Wacław Niżyński, IPA: [ˈvatswaf ɲiˈʐɨj̃skʲi]) (12 March 1889/1890 – 8 April 1950) was a Russian ballet dancer and choreographer of Polish ancestry. He is regarded as the greatest male dancer of the early 20th century. He is often associated with the Ballets Russes and its impresario Sergei Diaghilev, for which he choreographed such influential ballets as L'après-midi d'un faune (1912), Le Sacre du Printemps (1913), Jeux (1913), and Till Eulenspiegel (1916). He was celebrated for his virtuosity and for the depth and intensity of his characterizations. He could dance en pointe, a rare skill among male dancers at the time, and was admired for his seemingly gravity-defying leaps.

== Biography ==
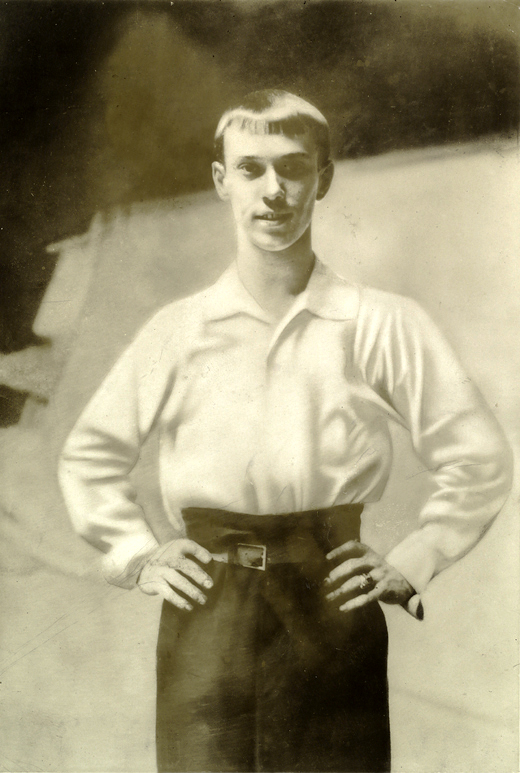
Nijinsky in Krasnoye Selo, 1907

Vaslav Nijinsky was born in 1889 or 1890 in Kiev, Russian Empire (now Ukraine), as Wacław Niżyński, to ethnic Polish parents, touring dancers Tomasz Niżyński (born 7 March 1862) and Eleanora Bereda (born 28 December 1856). Nijinsky was christened in Warsaw. He identified himself as Polish although he grew up in the interior of Russia with his parents and he had difficulty speaking Polish.

Eleanora, along with her two brothers and two sisters, was orphaned while still a child. She started to earn a living as an extra in Warsaw's Grand Theatre Ballet (Polish: Teatr Wielki), becoming a full member of the company at age thirteen. In 1868 her talent was spotted and she moved to Kiev as a solo dancer. Tomasz Niżyński also attended the Wielki Theatre school, becoming a soloist there. At age 18 he accepted a soloist contract with the Odessa Theatre. The two met, married in May 1884 and settled into a career with the traveling Setov opera company. Tomasz was premier danseur, and Eleanora a soloist. Eleanora continued to tour and dance while having three children, sons Stanislav (born 29 December 1886 in Tiflis) and Vaslav; and daughter Bronislava ('Bronia', born 8 January 1891 in Minsk). She had depression, which may have been a genetic vulnerability shared in a different form by her son Vaslav. Both boys received training from their father and appeared in an amateur Hopak production in Odessa in 1894.

After Josef Setov died about 1894, the company disbanded. Thomas attempted to run his own company, but was not successful. He and his family became itinerant dancers, the children appearing in the Christmas show at Nizhny Novgorod. In 1897 Thomas and Eleanora separated after Thomas had fallen in love with another dancer, Rumiantseva, while touring in Finland. Eleanora moved to 20 Mokhovaya Street in St Petersburg with her children. She persuaded a friend from the Wielki Theatre, Victor Stanislas Gillert, who was at the time teaching at the Imperial Ballet School, to help get Vaslav into the school. He arranged for the noted teacher Enrico Cecchetti to sponsor the application. Bronia entered the school two years after Vaslav. Their elder brother Stanislav had had a fall from a window when young and seemed to have suffered some brain damage. Vaslav and Bronia, just two years apart, became very close as they grew. As he got older, Stanislav became increasingly mentally unstable and would have fierce tantrums. He was admitted to an asylum for the insane in 1902.

=== Imperial Ballet School ===
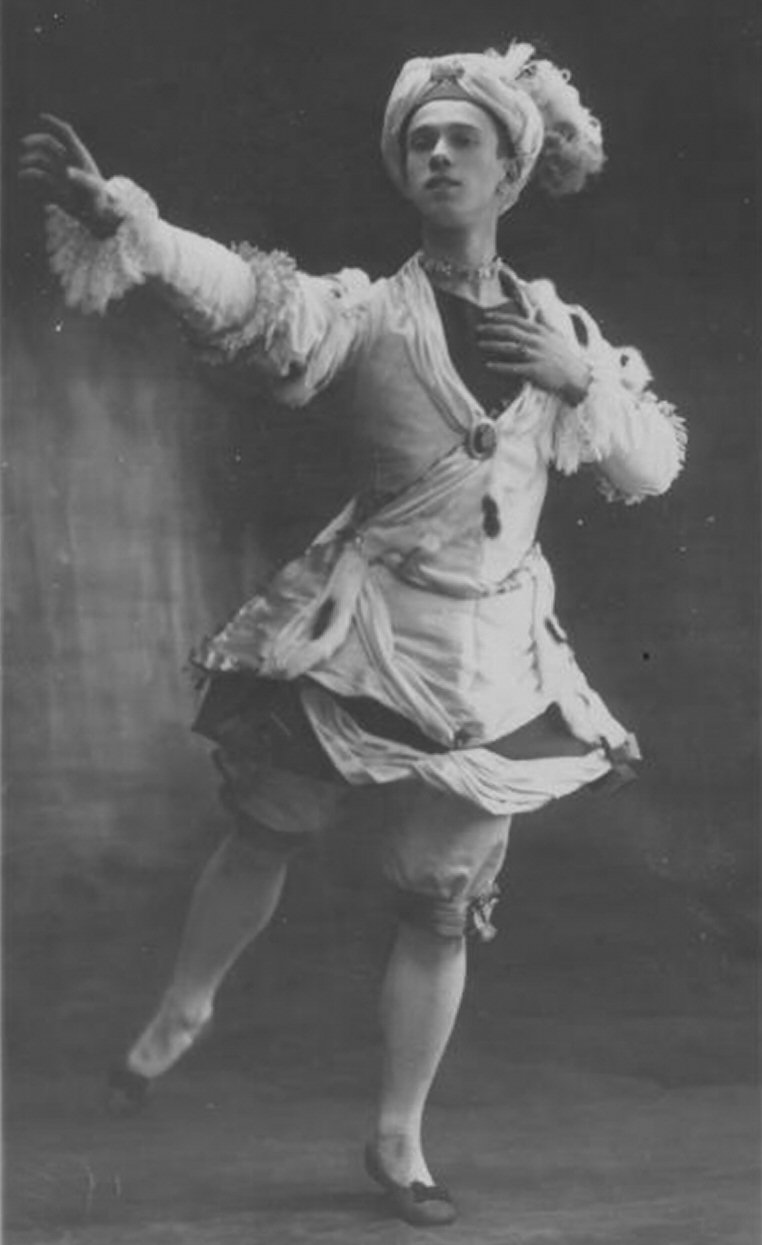
Nijinsky as Armide's slave in Le Pavillon d'Armide. The middle act was originally choreographed by Michel Fokine as L'animation de Gobelins for the 1907 Imperial ballet school student show, and was performed by the new Ballets Russes on its opening night in Paris, 1909.

In 1900, Nijinsky joined the Imperial Ballet School, where he initially studied dance under Sergei Legat and his brother Nikolai. He studied mime under Pavel Gerdt; all three men were principal dancers at the Imperial Russian Ballet. At the end of the one year probationary period, his teachers agreed upon Nijinsky's exceptional dancing ability and he was confirmed as a boarder at the school. He appeared in supporting parts in classical ballets such as Faust, as a mouse in The Nutcracker, a page in Sleeping Beauty and Swan Lake, and won the Didelot scholarship. During his first year, his academic studies had covered work he had already done, so his relatively poor results had not been so much noted. He did well in subjects which interested him, but not otherwise.

In 1902 he was warned that only the excellence of his dancing had prevented his expulsion from the school for poor results. This laxity was compounded through his school years by Nijinsky's frequently being chosen as an extra in various productions, forcing him to be away from classrooms for rehearsals and to spend nights at performances. He was teased for being Polish, and nicknamed "Japonczek" for his faintly Japanese looks at a time Russia was at war with Japan. Some classmates were envious and resented his outstanding dancing ability. In 1901 one of the class deliberately caused him to fall, leading to his concussion and being in a coma for four days.

Mikhail Oboukhov became his teacher in 1902, and awarded him the highest grade he had ever given to a student. He was given student parts in command performances in front of the Tsar of Paquita, The Nutcracker and The Little Humpbacked Horse. In music he studied piano, flute, balalaika and accordion, receiving good marks. He had a good ability to hear and play music on the piano, though his sight reading was relatively poor. Against this, his behaviour was sometimes boisterous and wild, resulting in his expulsion from the school in 1903 for an incident involving students shooting at the hats of passers-by with catapults while being driven to the Mariinsky Theatre in carriages. He was readmitted to the school as a non-resident after a sound beating and restored to his previous position after a month's probation.

In 1904, at the age of 14, Nijinsky was selected by the great choreographer Marius Petipa to dance a principal role in what proved to be the choreographer's last ballet, La Romance d'un Bouton de rose et d'un Papillon. The work was never performed due to the outbreak of the Russo-Japanese War.

On Sunday, 9 January 1905, Nijinsky was caught in the Bloody Sunday massacre in St. Petersburg, where a group of petitioners led by Father Gapon attempted to present their petition to the Czar. Soldiers fired upon the crowd, leading to an estimated 1000 casualties. Nijinsky was caught in the crowd on Nevsky Prospect and propelled toward the Winter Palace. Imperial cavalry troops charged the crowd, leaving him with a head wound. The following day, he returned to the scene with a friend whose sister was missing. She was never found.

Nijinsky became calmer and more serious as he grew older, but continued to struggle to make friends, something which would persist throughout his life. His reserve and apparent dullness made him unappealing to others except when he danced.

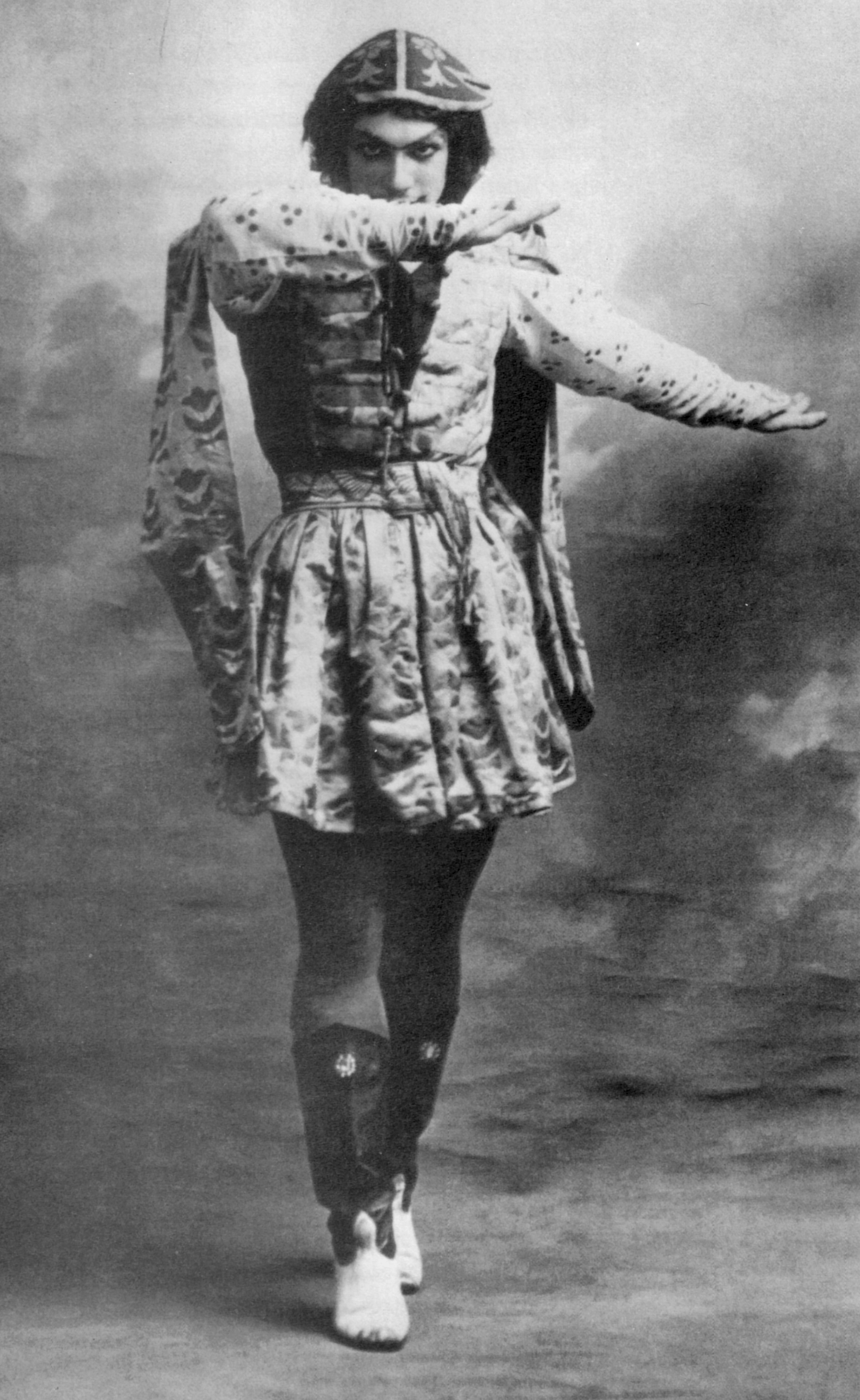
Nijinsky in Le Festin, a suite of classic dances performed on the opening night of the Ballets Russes in Paris, May 1909. The company's courier later described the audience's reaction to Nijinsky's performance with Tamara Karsavina in the Bluebird (ballet) pas de deux: "when those two came on, good Lord! I have never seen such a public. You would have thought their seats were on fire."

The 1905 annual student show included a pas de deux from The Persian Market, danced by Nijinsky and Sofia Fedorova. Oboukhov amended the dance to show off Nijinsky's abilities, drawing gasps and then spontaneous applause in the middle of the performance with his first jump.

In 1906, he danced in the Mariinsky production of Mozart's Don Giovanni, in a ballet sequence choreographed by Michel Fokine. He was congratulated by the director of the Imperial Ballet and offered a place in the company although he was a year from graduation. Nijinsky chose to continue his studies. He tried his hand at choreography, with a children's opera, Cinderella, with music by another student, Boris Asafyev. At Christmas, he played the King of the Mice in The Nutcracker. At his graduation performance in April 1907, he partnered Elizaveta Gerdt, in a pas de deux choreographed by Fokine. He was congratulated by prima ballerina Mathilde Kschessinska of the Imperial Ballet, who invited him to partner her. His future career with the Imperial Ballet was guaranteed to begin at the mid-rank level of coryphée, rather than in the corps de ballet. He graduated second in his class, with top marks in dancing, art and music.

=== Early career ===
Nijinsky spent his summer after graduation rehearsing and then performing at Krasnoe Selo in a makeshift theatre with an audience mainly of army officers. These performances frequently included members of the Imperial family and other nobility, whose support and interest were essential to a career. Each dancer who performed before the Tsar received a gold watch inscribed with the Imperial Eagle. Buoyed by Nijinsky's salary, his new earnings from giving dance classes, and his sister Bronia's employment with the ballet company, the family moved to a larger flat on Torgovaya Ulitsa. The new season at the Mariinsky theatre began in September 1907, with Nijinsky employed as coryphée (instead of in the corps de ballet) on a salary of 780 roubles per year.

He appeared with Sedova, Lydia Kyasht and Karsavina. Kchessinska partnered him in La fille mal gardée, where he succeeded in an atypical role for him involving humour and flirtation. Designer Alexandre Benois proposed a ballet based upon Le Pavillon d'Armide, choreographed by Fokine to music by Nikolai Tcherepnin. Nijinsky had a minor role, but it allowed him to show off his technical abilities with leaps and pirouettes. The partnership of Fokine, Benois and Nijinsky was repeated throughout his career. Shortly after, he upstaged his own performance, appearing in the Bluebird pas de deux from the Sleeping Beauty, partnering Lydia Kyasht. The Mariinsky audience was deeply familiar with the piece, but exploded with enthusiasm for his performance and his appearing to fly, an effect he continued to have on audiences with the piece during his career.

In subsequent years, Nijinsky was given several soloist roles at the Mariinsky. In 1910, Mathilde Kschessinska selected Nijinsky to dance in a revival of Petipa's Le Talisman. Nijinsky created a sensation in the role of the Wind God Vayou.

=== Ballets Russes ===
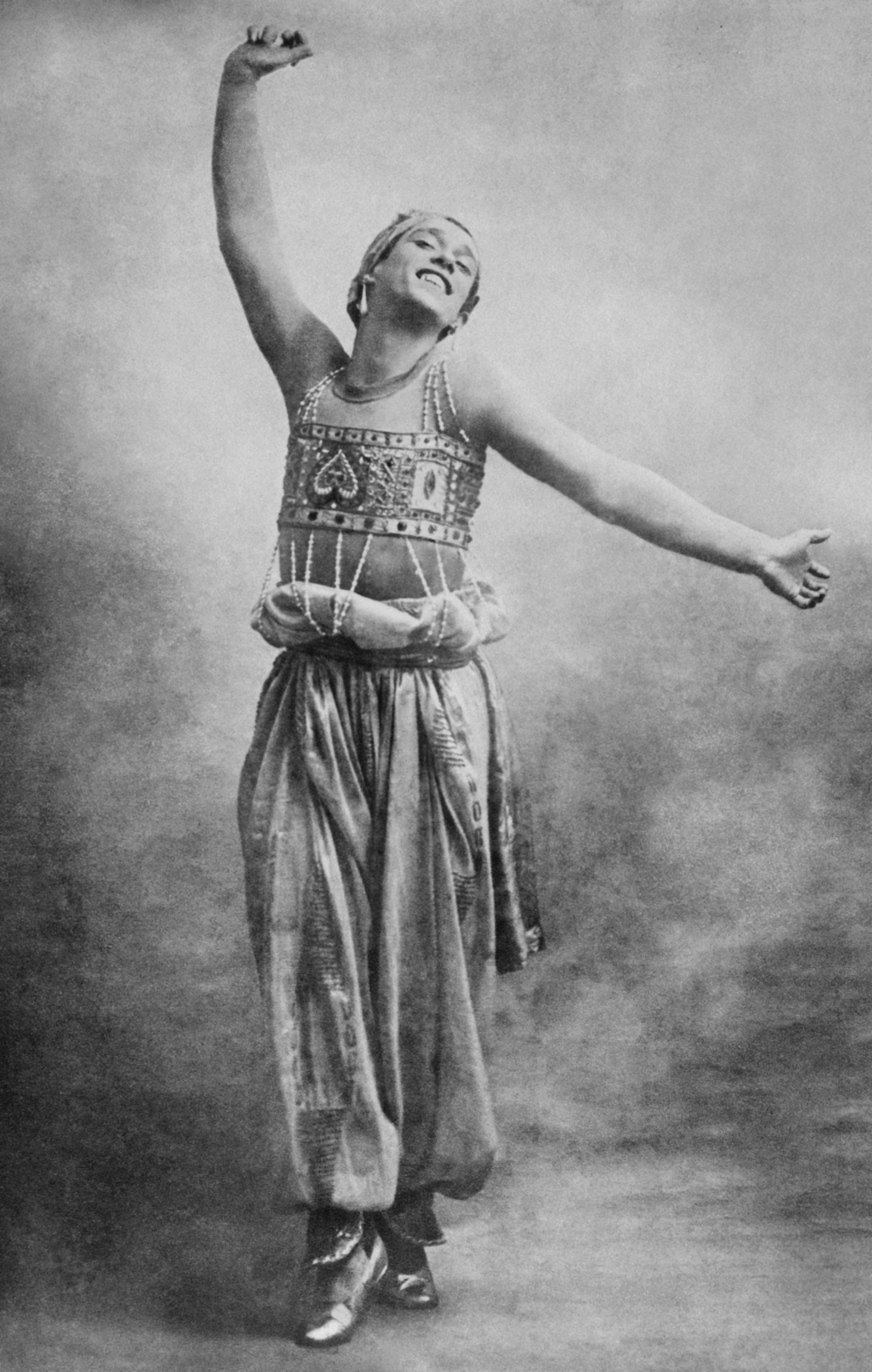
Vaslav Nijinsky in Scheherazade

A turning point for Nijinsky was his meeting the Russian Sergei Diaghilev, a celebrated and highly innovative producer of ballet and opera, as well as art exhibitions. He concentrated on promoting Russian visual and musical art abroad, particularly in Paris. The 1908 season of colorful Russian ballets and operas, works mostly new to the West, was a great success, leading him to plan a new tour for 1909 with a new name for his company, the now famous Ballets Russes. He worked closely with choreographer Michel Fokine and artist Léon Bakst, and later with other contemporary artists and composers. Nijinsky and Diaghilev became lovers for a time, and Diaghilev was deeply involved in directing and managing Nijinsky's career. Nijinsky became the company's star male dancer, causing an enormous stir amongst audiences whenever he performed. In ordinary life, he appeared unremarkable and was withdrawn in conversation. At the same time, the Ballets Russes gave Nijinsky the chance to expand his art and experiment with dance and choreography; he created new directions for male dancers while becoming internationally famous.

=== 1909 opening season ===
During the winter of 1908/9, Diaghilev started planning for the 1909 Paris tour of opera and ballet. He collected a team including designers Alexandre Benois and Léon Bakst, painters Nicholas Roerich and Konstantin Korovin, composers Alexander Glazunov and Nikolai Tcherepnin, regisseurs Vsevolod Meyerhold and Alexander Sanine and other ballet enthusiasts. As a friend and as a leading dancer, Nijinsky was part of the group. His sister wrote that he felt intimidated by the illustrious and aristocratic company. Fokine was asked to start rehearsals for the existing Le Pavillon d'Armide and for Les Sylphides, an expanded version of his Chopiniana. Fokine favoured expanding the existing Une Nuit d'Egypte for a ballet.

Diaghilev accepted the idea of an Egyptian theme, but he required a comprehensive rewrite based on new music, by which Fokine created a new ballet Cléopâtre. To round out the program, they needed another ballet. Without sufficient time to compose a new work, they decided on a suite of popular dances, to be called Le Festin. Anna Pavlova, Karsavina and Nijinsky were chosen as principal dancers. Fokine insisted that Ida Rubenstein would appear as Cleopatra, and Nijinsky insisted that his sister should have a part. Fokine noted Nijinsky's great ability at learning a dance and precisely what a choreographer wanted. Diaghilev departed for Paris in early 1909 to make arrangements, which were immediately complicated on the day of his return, 22 February 1909, by the death of Grand Duke Vladimir Alexandrovich, who had sponsored an application by Diaghilev for an imperial subsidy of 100,000 roubles for the tour.

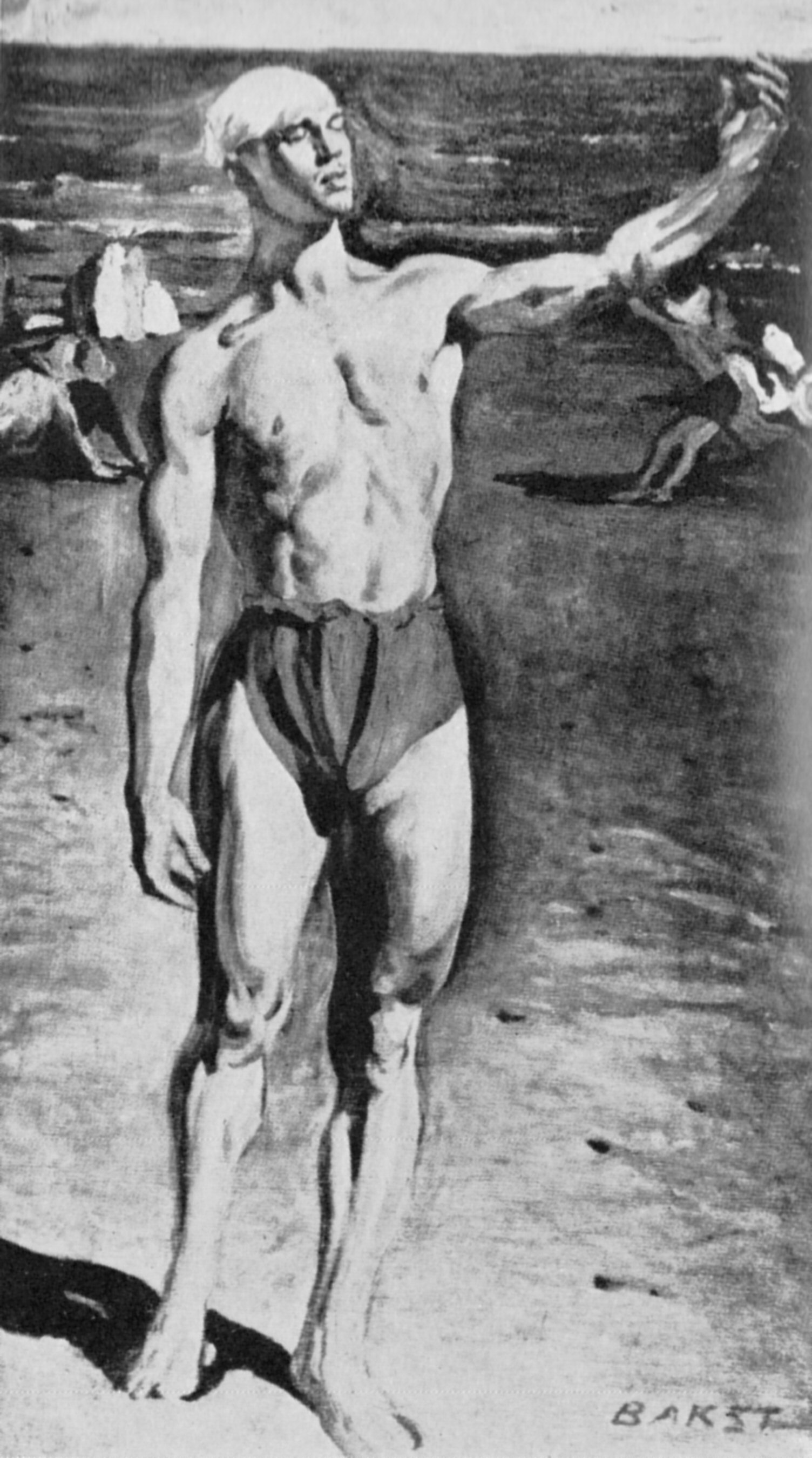
Nijinsky painted by Léon Bakst at the Venice Lido, 1910

Rehearsals started on 2 April at the Hermitage Theatre, which the company had been granted special permission to use, along with loans of scenery. No sooner had rehearsals started that the permission was withdrawn, disappearing as had the imperial subsidy. Diaghilev managed to raise some money in Russia, but he had to rely significantly on Gabriel Astruc, who had been arranging theatres and publicity on behalf of the company in France, to also provide finance. Plans to include Opera had to be dropped because of the lack of finances, and logistical difficulties in obtaining necessary scenery at short notice and for free.

Diaghilev and Nijinsky travelled to Paris ahead of the rest of the company. Initially Nijinsky stayed at the Hôtel Daunou. He moved to the Hôtel de Hollande together with Diaghilev and his secretary, Alexis Mavrine, before the arrival of the others. Members of the company had noticed Diaghilev keeping a particularly proprietorial eye on Nijinsky during rehearsals in Russia. They took the travel arrangements and accommodation as confirmation of a relationship. Prince Lvov had visited Nijinsky's mother in St Petersburg, telling her tearfully that he would no longer be taking a special interest in her son, but he advanced a significant sum to Diaghilev towards the tour's expenses. Mavrine was known to have been Diaghilev's lover, but left the tour together with Olga Pedorova shortly after it had begun.

The season of colorful Russian ballets and operas, works mostly new to the West, was a great success. The Paris seasons of the Ballets Russes were an artistic and social sensation; setting trends in art, dance, music and fashion for the next decade. Nijinsky's unique talent showed in Fokine's pieces such as Le Pavillon d'Armide (music by Nikolai Tcherepnin); Cleopatra (music by Anton Arensky and other Russian composers) and a divertissement La Fête. His expressive execution of a pas de deux from The Sleeping Beauty (Tchaikovsky) was a tremendous success.

=== Later seasons ===
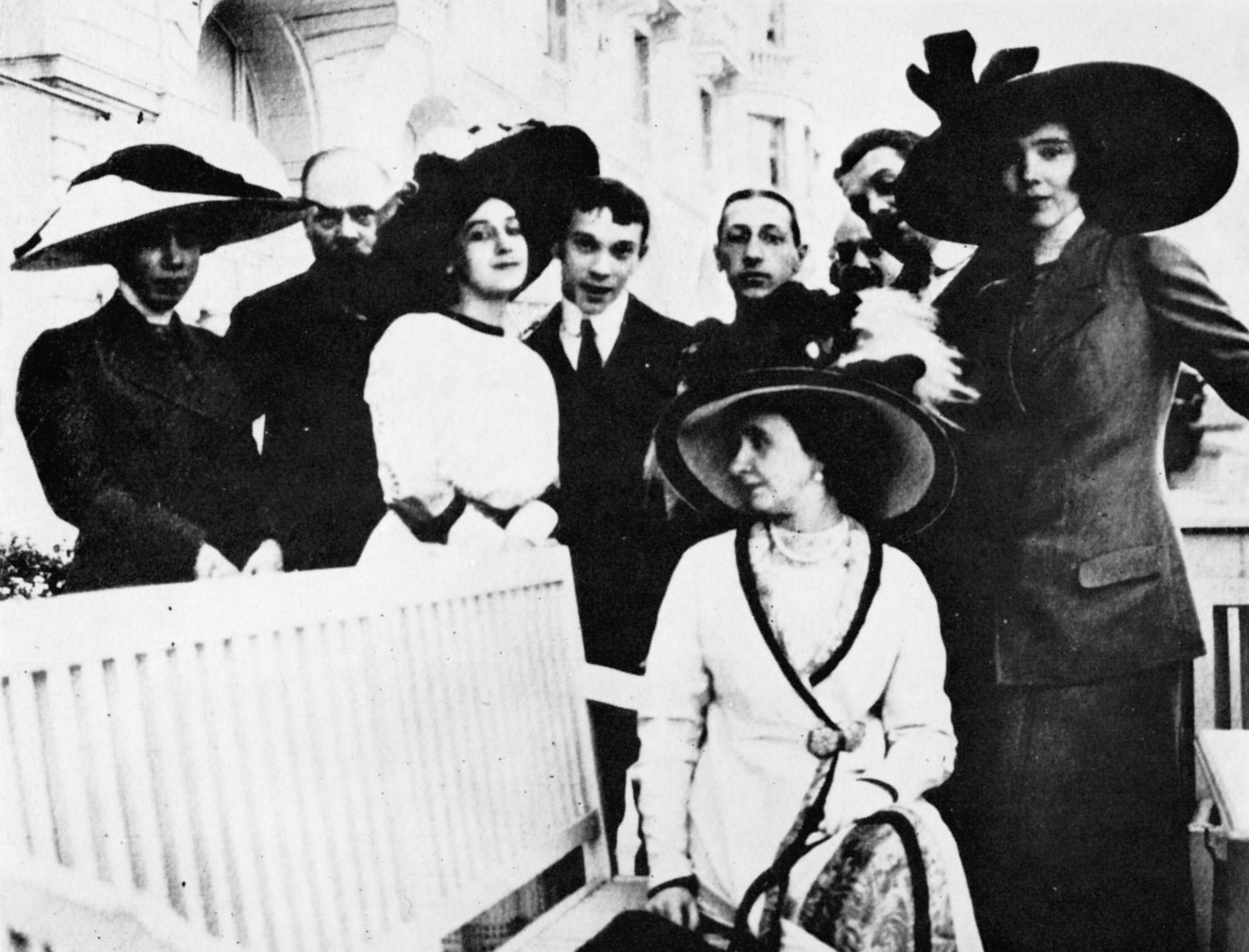
Group of supporters and members of the Ballets Russes taken by one of its founders, Nicolas Besobrasov. From left to right, in hat Alexandra Sergueievna Botkina, Pavel Koribut-Kubitovitch, Tamara Karsavina, Vaslav Nijinsky, Igor Stravinsky, Alexandre Benois, Sergei Diaghilev, K Harris. Front, Alexandra Vassilieva. Taken in 1911, three days before the premiere of Spectre de la rose.

In 1910, he performed in Giselle, and Fokine's ballets Carnaval and Scheherazade (based on the orchestral suite by Rimsky-Korsakov). His portrayal of "Petrushka," the puppet with a soul, was a remarkable display of his expressive ability to portray characters. His partnership with Tamara Karsavina, also of the Mariinsky Theatre, was legendary, and they have been called the "most exemplary artists of the time".

In January 1911 he danced in Giselle at the Mariinsky Theatre in St. Petersburg for the Imperial Ballet, with the Tsarina Alexandra Feodorovna in attendance. His costume, which had been designed by Benois and used in Paris before, caused a scandal, as he danced in tights without the then-common trousers. He refused to apologize and was dismissed from the Imperial Ballet. It is possible that he was not altogether unhappy about this development, as he was now free to concentrate on the Ballets Russes.

=== Ballets choreographed by Nijinsky ===
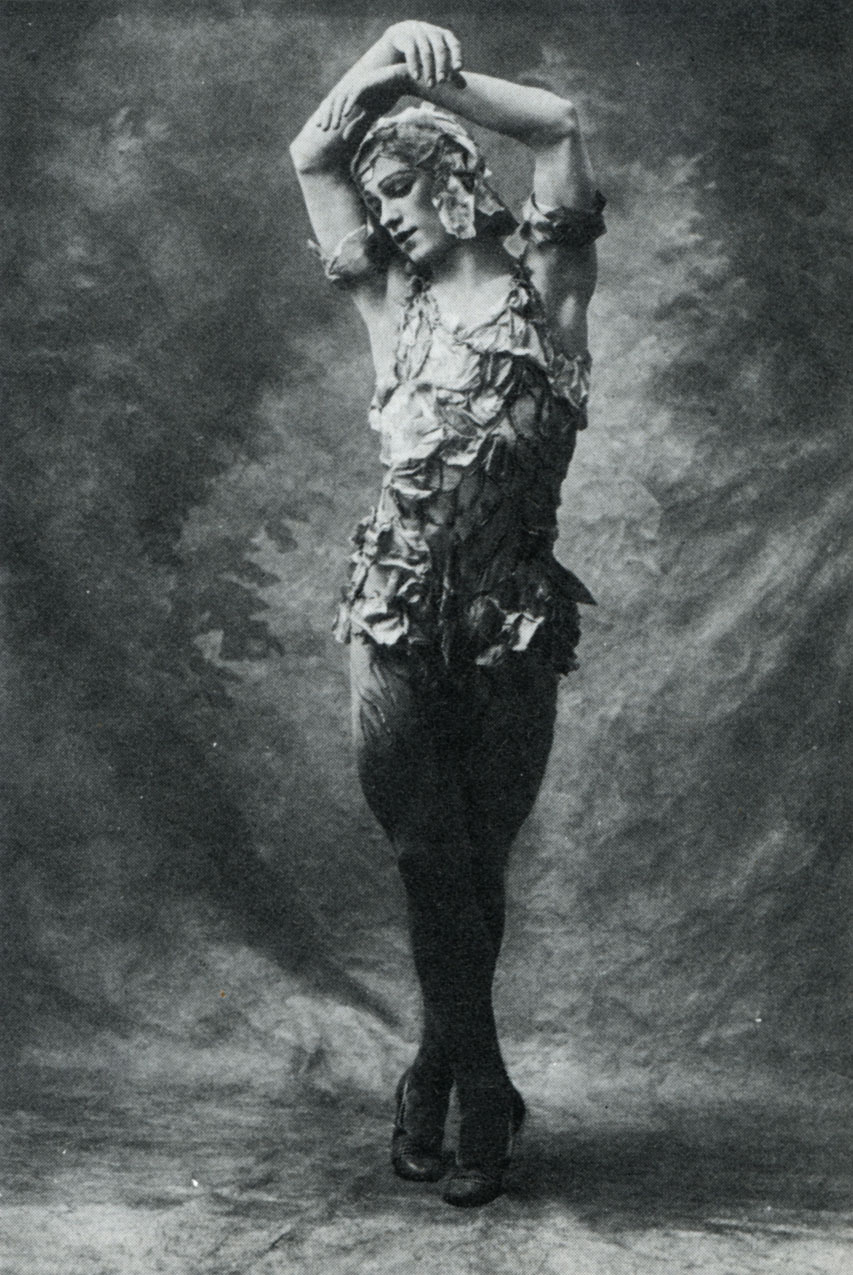
Nijinsky in Le Spectre de la Rose (1911)

Nijinsky took the creative reins and choreographed ballets which pushed boundaries and stirred controversy. His ballets were L'après-midi d'un faune (The Afternoon of a Faun, based on Claude Debussy's Prélude à l'après-midi d'un faune) (1912); Jeux (1913); and Till Eulenspiegel (1916). These introduced his audiences to the new direction of modern dance. As the title character in L'après-midi d'un faune, in the final tableau, he mimed masturbation with the scarf of a nymph, causing a scandal; he was defended by such artists as Auguste Rodin, Odilon Redon and Marcel Proust. Nijinsky's new trends in dance caused a riotous reaction at the Théâtre des Champs-Élysées when they premiered in Paris.

In The Rite of Spring (Le Sacre du Printemps), with music by Igor Stravinsky (1913), Nijinsky created choreography that exceeded the limits of traditional ballet and propriety. The radically angular movements expressed the heart of Stravinsky's radically modern score. Violence broke out in the audience as The Rite of Spring premiered. The theme of the ballet, based on pagan myths, was a young maiden who sacrificed herself by dancing until she died. The theme, the difficult and challenging music of Stravinsky, and Nijinsky's choreography, led to a violent uproar; Diaghilev was pleased with the notoriety. That same year, Nijinsky conceived Jeux as a flirtatious interaction among three males, although Diaghilev insisted it be danced by one male and two females.

=== Marriage ===
Nijinsky's work in choreographing ballets had proved controversial. They were time-consuming to rehearse and badly received by critics. Diaghilev asked him to begin preparing a new ballet, La Légende de Joseph, based on the Bible. Aside from Nijinsky's difficulties, Diaghilev came under pressure from financial backers and theatre owners who wanted productions more in the style of previous successful work. Although Diaghilev had become unhappy with Fokine's work, thinking he had lost his originality, he returned to him for two new ballets, including Joseph. Relations between Diaghilev and Nijinsky had deteriorated under the stress of Nijinsky's becoming principal choreographer and his pivotal role in the company's financial success. Diaghilev could not face Nijinsky to tell him personally that he would no longer be choreographing the ballet Joseph, but instead asked his sister Bronia Nijinska to deliver the bad news.

The company was to embark on a tour of South America in August 1913. Nijinska, who had always worked closely with her brother and supported him, could not accompany the tour because she had married in July 1912 and become pregnant. In October 1912 their father had died while on tour with his dance company, causing another stress for the siblings. Diaghilev did not accompany the South American tour, claiming he had been told that he would die on the ocean. Others have suggested the reason had more to do with wanting to spend time away from Nijinsky and enjoy a holiday in Venice, "where perhaps adventures with pretty dark-eyed boys awaited him". Nijinsky set sail on a 21-day sea voyage in a state of turmoil and without the people who had been his closest advisers in recent years.

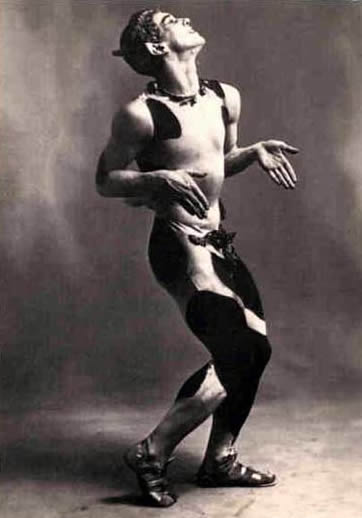
Nijinsky, 1912, dancing the Faun; photograph by Adolf de Meyer

The tour party included Romola de Pulszky, whose father Count Charles Pulszky was a Hungarian politician, and mother Emilia Márkus was a noted actress. In March 1912 the recently engaged Romola was taken to see the Ballets Russes in Budapest by her prospective mother-in-law and was greatly impressed. Nijinsky had not been performing, but she returned the following day and saw him: "An electric shock passed through the entire audience. Intoxicated, entranced, gasping for breath, we followed this superhuman being... the power, the featherweight lightness, the steel-like strength, the suppleness of his movements..." Romola broke off her engagement and began following the Ballets Russes across Europe, attending every performance she could. Nijinsky was difficult to approach, being always accompanied by a 'minder'. However, Romola befriended Adolf Bolm, who had previously visited her mother, thereby gaining access to the company and backstage. She and Nijinsky shared no common language; she spoke French but he knew only a little, so many of their early conversations involved an interpreter. When first introduced to her, he gained the impression she was a Hungarian prima ballerina and was friendly. Discovering his mistake, he ignored her thereafter.

Romola did not give up. She persuaded Diaghilev that her amorous interests lay with Bolm, that she was rich and interested in supporting ballet. He allowed her to take ballet lessons with Enrico Cecchetti, who accompanied the troupe coaching the dancers. Nijinsky objected to her taking class with the professionals. Cecchetti warned her against becoming involved with Nijinsky (describing him as "like a sun that pours forth light but never warms"), but Diaghilev's endorsement meant that Nijinsky paid her some attention. Romola took every opportunity to be near Nijinsky, booking train compartments or cabins close to his. She was likely warned that he was homosexual by Marie Rambert, whom Romola befriended and who was also in love with Nijinsky. As a devout Catholic, she prayed for his conversion to heterosexuality. She referred to him as Le Petit, and wanted to have his child.

On board ship, Romola had a cabin in first class, which allowed her to keep a watch on Nijinsky's door, while most of the company were exiled to second class. She befriended his masseur and was rewarded with a rundown on his musculature. Determined to take every opportunity, she succeeded in spending more and more time in his company. The unexpected friendliness was noticed by Baron de Gunzburg (Dimitri de Gunzburg), an investor in the Ballets Russes, who had been tasked with keeping an eye on the company. Instead of reporting to Diaghilev on what was occurring, Gunsbourg agreed to act on Nijinsky's behalf in presenting a proposal of marriage to Romola. Romola thought a cruel joke was being played on her, and ran off to her cabin crying. However, Nijinsky asked her again, in broken French and mime, and she accepted. Although Gunsbourg had a financial interest in Ballets Russes, he was also interested in forming his own company, and a split between Diaghilev and his star dancer might have presented him with an opportunity.

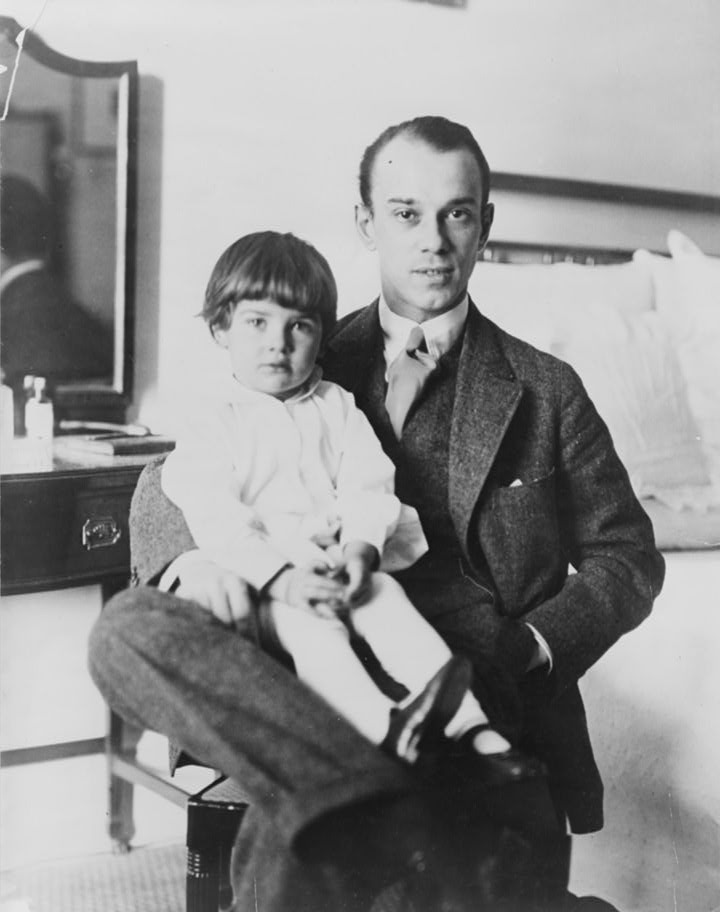
Nijinsky and daughter Kyra, 1916, Miami Biltmore Hotel

When the ship stopped at Rio de Janeiro, Brazil, the couple went straight to buy wedding rings. Adolph Bolm warned Romola against proceeding, saying "It will ruin your life". Gunsbourg hurried to arrange the marriage, getting permission by telegram from Romola's mother. A quick wedding could take place once the ship arrived at Buenos Aires, Argentina; the couple were married on 10 September 1913 and the event was announced to the world's press. Back in Europe, Diaghilev "gave himself to a wild orgy of dissipation...Sobbing shamelessly in Russian despair, he bellowed accusations and recriminations; he cursed Nijinsky's ingratitude, Romola's treachery, and his own stupidity".

As the company was due to start performing immediately, the couple had no honeymoon. A few days after the marriage, Nijinsky tried to teach Romola some ballet, but she was not interested. "I asked her to learn dancing because for me dancing was the highest thing in the world", "I realized that I had made a mistake, but the mistake was irreparable. I had put myself in the hands of someone who did not love me." Romola and Nijinsky did not share accommodations until after the season was safely underway, when she was eventually invited to join him in separate bedrooms in his hotel suite. She "almost cried with thankfulness" that he showed no interest in making love on their wedding night. Still, the couple had two daughters together, Kyra and Tamara Nijinska.

=== Dismissal from Ballets Russes ===
On returning to Paris, Nijinsky anticipated returning to work on new ballets, but Diaghilev did not meet him. Eventually he sent a telegram to Nijinsky informing him that he was no longer employed by the Ballets Russes. Nijinsky had missed a performance in Rio when Romola was ill, and only in the case of a dancer's own illness, certified by a doctor, was the dancer allowed to miss a performance. Diaghilev also usually dismissed dancers who married. This was perhaps beside the point, since Nijinsky had never had a contract, nor wages, all his expenses having been paid by Diaghilev. His mother also received an allowance of 500 francs per month (other senior dancers had received 200,000 francs for a six-month season). Fokine was re-employed by Diaghilev as choreographer and premier danseur, accepting on the condition that none of Nijinsky's ballets would be performed. Leonide Massine joined the company as the new attractive young lead for Joseph.

The Ballets Russes had lost its most famous and crowd-pulling dancer, but Nijinsky's position was even more difficult. He appears not to have appreciated that his marriage would result in a break with Diaghilev's company, although many others immediately expected this would be the result. The Ballets Russes and the Imperial Russian ballet were the pre-eminent ballet companies in the world and uniquely had permanent companies of dancers staging full-scale new productions. Nijinsky now was "an experimental artist. He needed roles that would extend his gifts, and above all, he needed to choreograph. For these things he did need the Ballets Russes, which at that time was the only forward-thinking ballet company in the world."

Not only had Nijinsky previously left the Imperial ballet on doubtful terms, but he had not been granted exemption from compulsory military service in Russia, something that was normally given to its dancers. He could find only two offers, one a position with the Paris Opera, which would not start for more than a year; the other to take a ballet company to London for eight weeks to perform as part of a mixed bill at the Palace Theatre. Anna Pavlova sent him a caustic telegram, reminding him that he had disapproved some years before when she had appeared there in vaudeville. On another occasion, he had told a reporter, "One thing I am determined not to do, and that is to go on the music-hall stage."

Bronia was still in St Petersburg following the birth of her child, and Nijinsky asked her to be part of his new company. She was glad to do so, being concerned at how well he could cope without his customary supporters. When she arrived, there was friction between her and Romola: Bronia was critical that the new central figure in her brother's life showed so little organisational ability; Romola resented the closeness between brother and sister both in their shared language and in ability to work together in dance. The final company had only three experienced dancers: Nijinsky and Bronia plus her husband. Scenery was late, Fokine refused to allow the use of his ballets, there was inadequate time to rehearse, and Nijinsky became "more and more nervous and distraught". Diaghilev came to the opening night in March 1914.

The audience divided between those who had never seen ballet, who objected to the delays necessary for scene changes, and those who had seen Nijinsky before, who generally felt something was lacking ("He no longer danced like a god"). On another night, when the orchestra played music during the scene change so as to calm the audience, Nijinsky, having expressly banned this, flew into a rage and was discovered half dressed and screaming in his dressing room. He had to be calmed down enough to perform. He jumped on a stagehand who had flirted with Romola ("I had never seen Vaslav like that"). A new program was to be performed for the third week, but a packed house had to be told that Nijinsky was ill with a high temperature and could not perform. He missed three days, and the management had had enough. The show was cancelled, and Nijinsky was left with a considerable financial loss. Newspapers reported a nervous breakdown. His physical vulnerability had been aggravated by the great stress.

=== Later life ===
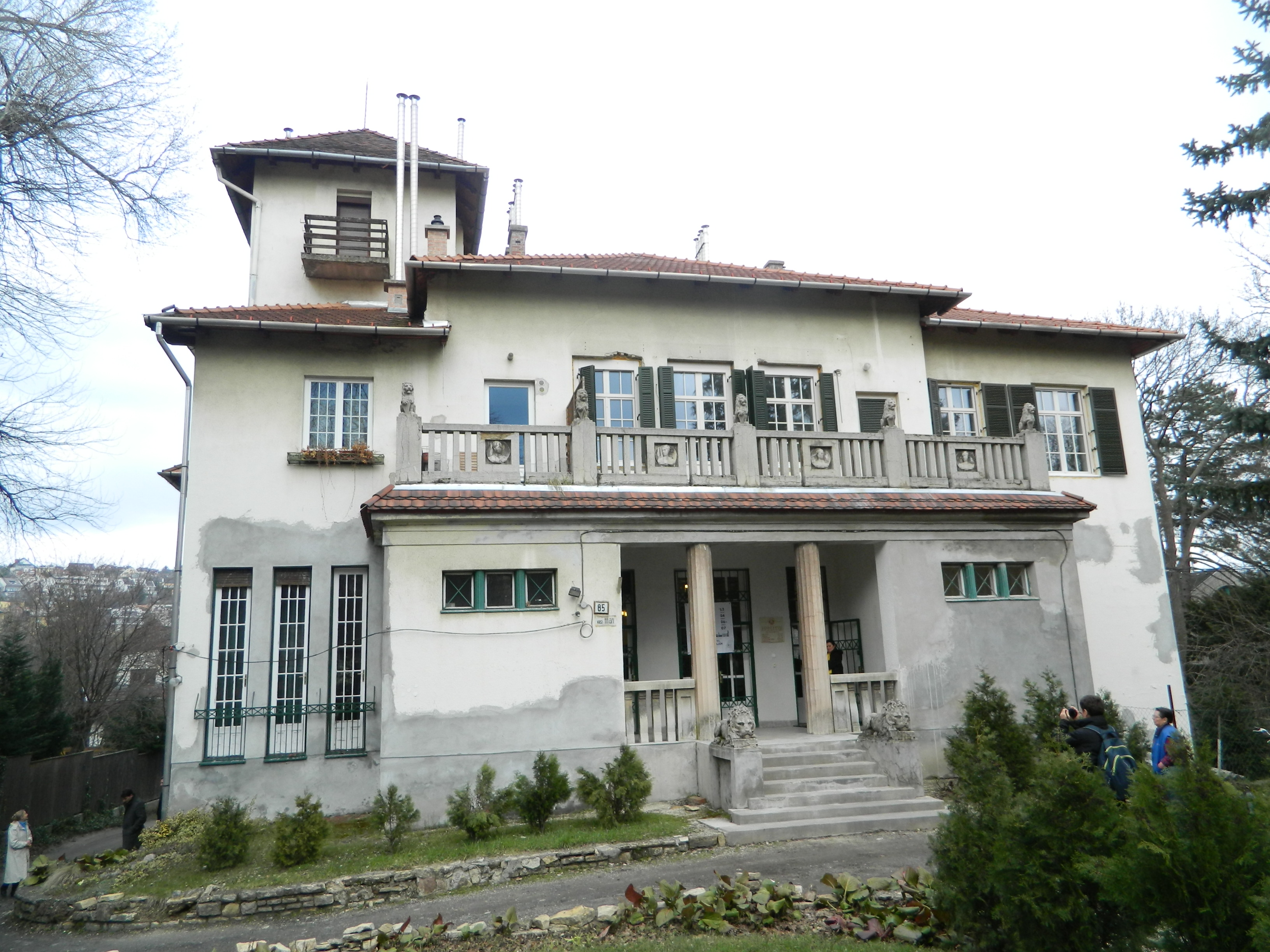
The Emilia Markus villa in Budapest; Vaslav Nijinsky lived here with his wife Romola Pulszky and children for a period. After 1920 he was mostly confined to asylums.

Romola was pregnant, so the couple returned to Budapest, Austro-Hungary, to his mother-in-law Emilia Markus' house. Their daughter Kyra (1914-1998) was born on 19 June 1914. With the start of the Great War (World War I), Nijinsky was classified as an enemy Russian citizen. He was confined to house arrest in Budapest and could not leave the country. The war made problems for the Ballets Russes too; the company had difficulty recruiting dancers and Fokine returned to Russia.

Diaghilev started negotiations in October 1914 for Nijinsky to work again for the company, but could not obtain release of the dancer until 1916. The complex negotiations included a prisoner exchange with the United States, and agreement that Nijinsky would dance and choreograph for the Ballets Russes' tour. King Alfonso XIII of Spain, Queen Alexandra of Denmark, Dowager Russian Empress Marie Feodorovna, Emperor Franz Joseph I of Austria, Pope Benedict XV, and President Woodrow Wilson at the urging of Otto Kahn all interceded on his behalf.

Nijinsky arrived in New York on 4 April 1916. The tour had already started in January with a number of problems: Faun was considered too sexually explicit and had to be amended; Scheherazade, including an interracial orgy, did not appeal to Americans; and ballet aficionados were calling for Nijinsky. Romola took over negotiations, demanding that Diaghilev pay Nijinsky for the years he had been unpaid by the Ballets Russes before he would dance in New York. This was settled after another week's delay by a down payment of $13,000 against the $90,000 claimed, plus a fee of $1000 for each performance in America.

Negotiations with Otto Kahn of the New York Metropolitan Opera led to an additional tour of the US being agreed to for the autumn. Kahn did not get on with Diaghilev and insisted Nijinsky should manage the tour. Massine and Diaghilev returned to Europe, leaving Nijinsky to dance and manage a company of more than 100 for a salary of $60,000. Nijinsky was also to prepare two new ballets. Rehearsals for Till Eulenspiegel did not go well; Nijinsky's poor communication skills meant that he could not explain to dancers what he wanted. He would explode into rages. Pierre Monteux, the conductor, refused to take part in performances because he did not want to be associated with failure. Nijinsky twisted his ankle, postponing the season's opening for a week and his own appearance by two weeks. Rehearsals for Eulenspiegel had not been completed, and it had to be improvised during its first performance. It was still well received, and Nijinsky's performance in Faun was considered better than Massine's. As the tour progressed, Nijinsky's performances received steady acclaim, although his management was haphazard and contributed to the tour's loss of $250,000.

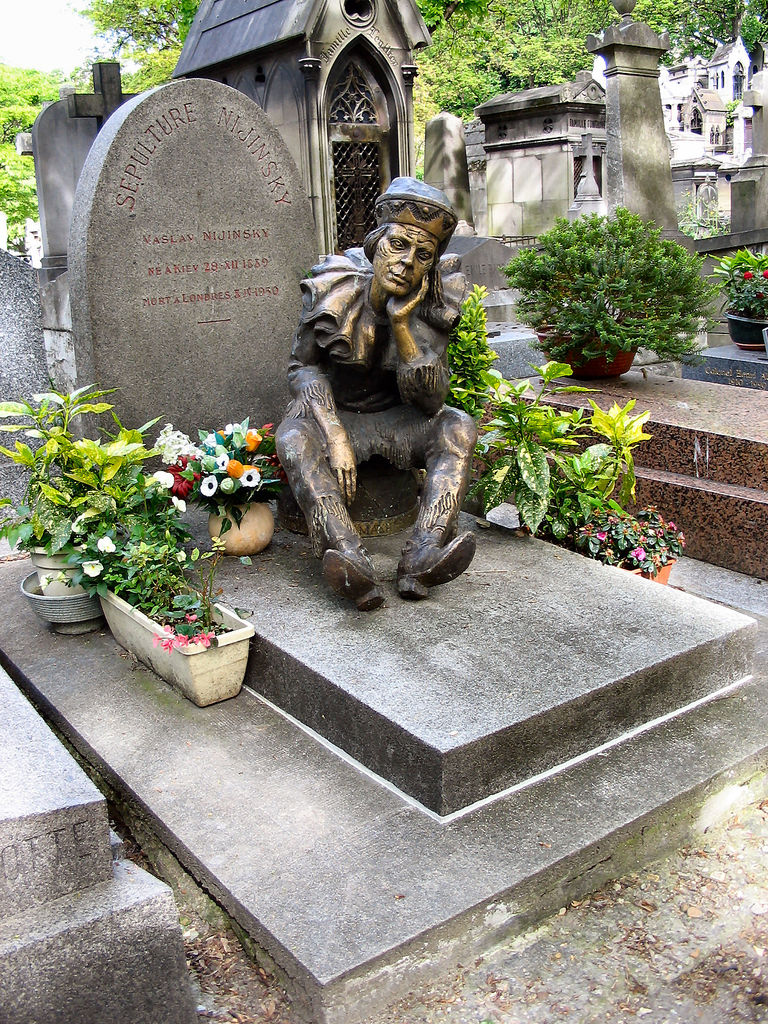
Tombstone of Vaslav Nijinsky in Montmartre Cemetery in Paris, showing year of birth as 1889. The statue, donated by a Russian group from Perm, without the family's permission, shows Nijinsky in character as the puppet Petrushka.

His last professional public performance was during a South American tour, with pianist Arthur Rubinstein in a benefit in Montevideo for the Red Cross on 30 September 1917, at age twenty-eight. Rubinstein wept when he saw Nijinsky's confusion that night. It was around this time that signs of his schizophrenia had become apparent to members of the company, including Bourman. Nijinsky and his wife moved to St. Moritz, Switzerland, where he tried to recover from the stresses of the tour. Also in 1917, Bronia and Vaslav lost their older brother Stanislav, who died in a hospital in Petrograd. Accounts vary as to the cause of death. He had been institutionalized for many years.

On Sunday, 19 January 1919, Vaslav Nijinsky made one last public appearance: a solo improvised performance at the Suvretta House in St Moritz. The crowd consisted of skiers, hotel guests, wealthy visitors from abroad, war refugees, and assorted social climbers. Bertha Asseo, a family friend, played the piano. Vaslav stood still for a good while before he finally started moving. His dance reflected a wide range of feelings, from sadness and anger to joyfulness. His strong feelings towards the devastation of the war, and people who did nothing to stop it, were also reflected in his dance.

Nijinsky's diary, which he wrote from January to early March 1919, expressed his great fear of hospitalization and confinement. He filled it with drawings of eyes, as he felt himself under scrutiny, by his wife, a young doctor Frenkel, and others. Finally, Romola arranged a consultation in Zurich with the psychiatrist Eugen Bleuler in 1919, asking her mother and stepfather for help in getting Nijinsky there. His fears were realized; he was diagnosed with schizophrenia and committed to Burghölzli. After a few days, he was transferred to the Bellevue Sanatorium in Kreuzlingen, "a luxurious and humane establishment directed at that time by Ludwig Binswanger." In 1920, Nijinsky's second daughter Tamara (1920-2017) was born. She never saw him dance in public.

For the next 30 years, Nijinsky was in and out of psychiatric hospitals and asylums. During 1945, after the end of the war, after Romola had moved with him to Vienna, he encountered a group of Russian soldiers in an encampment, playing traditional folk tunes on a balalaika and other instruments. Inspired by the music and hearing a language from his youth, he started dancing, astounding the men with his skills. Drinking and laughing with them helped him start to speak again. He had maintained long periods of almost absolute silence during his years of illness. His wife Romola had protected them by staying for a time at the border of Hungary and Austria, trying to keep out of major areas of fighting.

From 1947, Nijinsky lived in Virginia Water, Surrey, England, with his wife. He died from kidney failure at a clinic in London on 8 April 1950 and was buried in London. He is survived by his wife, two daughters, and two grandchildren. In 1953, his body was moved to Montmartre Cemetery in Paris and reinterred beside the graves of Gaétan Vestris, Théophile Gautier, and Emma Livry.

== Legacy ==
Nijinsky's daughter Kyra married the Ukrainian conductor Igor Markevitch, and they had a son named Vaslav. The marriage ended in divorce.

His second daughter Tamara Nijinsky grew up with her maternal grandmother, never getting to see her father dance. Later she served as executive director of the Vaslav & Romola Nijinsky Foundation, founded by her mother, to preserve art and writing associated with her parents, and her father's dances.

Nijinsky's Diary was written during the six weeks in 1919 he spent in Switzerland before being committed to the asylum to Zurich. It reflected the decline of his household into chaos. He elevated feeling and action in his writing. It combined elements of autobiography with appeals for compassion toward the less fortunate. Discovering the three notebooks of the diary years later, plus another with letters to a variety of people, his wife published a bowdlerized version of the diary in 1936, translated into English by Jennifer Mattingly. She deleted about 40 per cent of the diary, especially references to bodily functions, sex, and homosexuality, recasting Nijinsky as an "involuntary homosexual". She also removed some of his more unflattering references to her and others close to their household. She moved sections around, obscuring the "march of events" obvious in the original version and toning down some of the odder portions, including trying to distinguish between sections in which he writes as God and others as himself. (In the original all such sections are written the same.)

In 1995, the first unexpurgated edition of The Diary of Vaslav Nijinsky was published, edited by The New Yorker dance critic Joan Acocella and translated by Kyril FitzLyon. Acocella notes that the diary displays three elements common to schizophrenia: "delusions, disorganized language, and disorganized behavior." It also demonstrates that Nijinsky's thought was showing a "breakdown in selective attention;" his associations would connect in ever-widening circles. A New York Times review said, "How ironic that in erasing the real ugliness of his insanity, the old version silenced not only Nijinsky's true voice but the magnificently gifted body from which it came. And how fortunate we are to have them both restored."

Jill Rivers, The Australian Ballet's media director from 1988 to 1998, stayed with Nijinsky's daughter Tamara and her daughter Kinga Nijinsky Gaspers in Phoenix, Arizona, in the early 2000s to research a biography on Nijinsky. She also interviewed Vaslav Markevitch, Nijinsky's grandson, in Tuscany. Twenty years later, after Tamara and Markevitch had died, and spurred by The Australian Ballet's revival of John Neumeier ballet Vaslav in 2025, Rivers published The Genius of Nijinsky.

Nijinsky is immortalized in numerous still photographs, many of them by E. O. Hoppé, who photographed the Ballets Russes seasons in London extensively between 1909 and 1921. No film exists of Nijinsky dancing; Diaghilev never allowed the Ballets Russes to be filmed because he felt that the quality of film at the time could never capture the artistry of his dancers. He believed that the reputation of the company would suffer if people saw their performance only in the short, jerky films of the period.

== Cultural depictions ==
=== In ballet ===
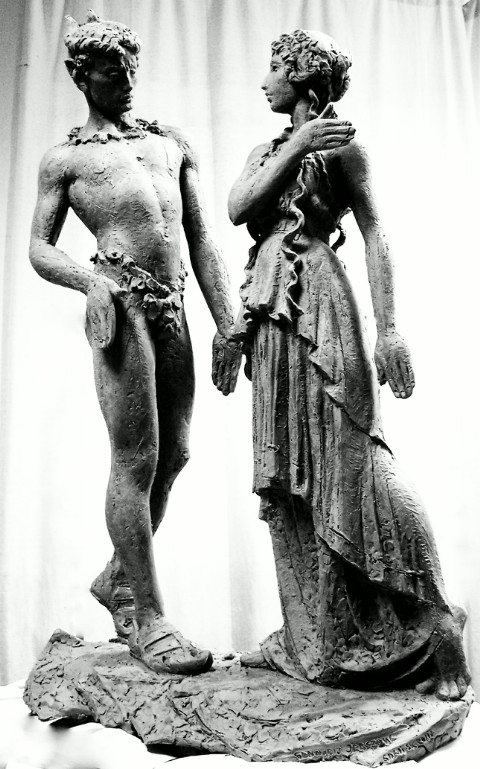
Sculpture of Vaslav and Bronislava Nijinska by Giennadij Jerszow, the Grand Theatre, Warsaw

- Nijinsky, Clown of God, choreography by Maurice Béjart, to music by Pierre Henry and Pyotr Ilyich Tchaikovsky. First performed by the Ballet of the Twentieth Century, Brussels, 1971.
- Vaslav (1979) Hamburg Ballet, choreographer John Neumeier
- Nijinsky – Divine Dancer (1990) by Joseph Hölderle (composer) and Juha Vanhakartano (choreographer). The libretto (Juha Vanhakartano) is based on Nijinsky's diary. The two act ballet (1st "Life" / 2nd "Death") was commissioned in 1989 on the occasion of Nijinsky's 100th birthday (1889 or 1890) by the Finnish National Opera and it was premiered on 18 January 1990 at the Finnish National Opera in Helsinki.
- Nijinski, choreography by Marco Goecke, to music by Frédéric Chopin. First performed by Gauthier Dance at the Theaterhaus in Stuttgart, Germany. In performance at the Staatsoper Hannover in the 2019/2020 season.
- Nijinsky premiered on 16 October 2025 at the Alberta Ballet in Calgary, and is a ballet in four parts:
  - Afternoon of a Faun (L'Après-midi), by Claude Debussy (composer), Vaslav Nijinsky (original choreography), Denise Clarke (new choreography and costume design), and Chris Cran (visual design);
  - Petrushka, by Igor Stravinsky (composer), Michel Fokine (original choreography), Alyssa Martin (new choreography), and Robyn Clarke (costume design);
  - Le Spectre de la Rose, by Hector Berlioz (composer), Michel Fokine (original choreography), Racheal Prince (new choreography and costume design), and Brandon Lee Alley (creative collaborator); and
  - The Firebird, by Igor Stravinsky (composer), Michel Fokine (original choreography), Kirsten Wicklund (new choreography), Peter Smida (creative collaborator), and Lorella Ferraro (costume design).

=== In plays ===
- In 1974–75, Terence Rattigan was commissioned to write a play about Nijinsky and Diaghilev for the BBC's Play of the Month series. Romola Nijinsky objected to her late husband's being depicted as a homosexual by a writer she believed was homosexual. Rattigan withdrew the work, prohibiting its production in his lifetime. He died in 1977. The play was staged posthumously at Chichester Festival Theatre in 2013.
- c. 1975–76, Nijinsky by Rex Doyle was performed at the Crucible Theatre, Sheffield. The title part was played by Alan Rickman, in one of his first stage roles.
- A Cavalier for Milady: A Play in Two Scenes [c. 1976] is a one-act play by Tennessee Williams that includes a fantastical, non-literal appearance by Nijinsky. In the play, an adult woman named Nance (who is dressed a Victorian era child) has been left by her mother with a hostile "babysitter," who is distressed by the attention that Nance is paying to a Greek statue of a "naked man". After the babysitter leaves, an apparition of Nijinsky appears, comforting Nance.
- David Pownall's Death of a Faun (1998) used the death of impresario Sergei Diaghilev as a catalyst to rouse Nijinsky out of a Swiss sanatorium "to pay tribute". Nicholas Johnson, a Royal Ballet dancer, portrayed the schizophrenic Nijinsky.
- Leonard Crofoot wrote Nijinsky Speaks (1998) as a monologue spanning the dancer's career; he played the role of Nijinsky and did his own dancing.
- William Luce's Nijinsky (2000), a two-act play for six performers, had its world premiere (in Japanese) at Parco Theater in Tokyo with John Tillinger directing. .
- ICONS: The Lesbian and Gay History of the World, Vol. 5 (2011), actor/playwright Jade Esteban Estrada portrayed Nijinsky in this solo musical
- Nijinsky – The Miraculous God of Dance (2011), Sagiri Seina performed the title role in the Takarazuka Revue production in Japan.
- Étonne-Moi (2014), actor Jean Koning portrayed Nijinsky in the critically acclaimed solo play in the Netherlands.
- Letter To a Man (2016), directed by Robert Wilson with Mikhail Baryshnikov and played by Mikhail Baryshnikov is a staging of Nijinsky's diaries that chronicle the onset of his schizophrenia in 1919, his isolation, tormented sexuality and spirituality, and preoccupation with erstwhile lover and Ballets Russes founder Sergei Diaghilev.

=== In film ===
- Nijinsky (a.k.a. The Dancer) (planned film, 1970), the screenplay was written by American playwright Edward Albee. The film was to be directed by Tony Richardson and star Rudolf Nureyev as Nijinsky, Claude Jade as Romola and Paul Scofield as Diaghilev, but producer Harry Saltzman canceled the project during pre-production. According to Richardson, Saltzman had overextended himself and did not have the funds to make the film.
- Nijinsky (1980), directed by Herbert Ross, starring professional dancers George de la Peña as Nijinsky and Leslie Browne as Romola, with actors Alan Bates as Diaghilev and Jeremy Irons as Fokine. Romola Nijinsky had a writing credit for the film.
- Anna Pavlova (1983), directed by Emil Loteanu; portrayed by Mikhaill Krapivin.
- The Diaries of Vaslav Nijinsky (2001), written, shot, edited and directed by Paul Cox. The screenplay was based on Nijinsky's diaries, narrated by Derek Jacobi, with related imagery, including several Leigh Warren Dancers portraying Nijinsky.
- Riot at the Rite (2005), a TV drama, directed by Andy Wilson. Explores the first performance of The Rite of Spring in Paris. Nijinsky is portrayed by Adam Garcia.
- Nijinsky & Neumeier Soulmates in Dance (2009), documentary on influence of Nijinsky's work on the contemporary American choreographer John Neumeier. Produced by Lothar Mattner for WDR/ARTE.
- Coco Chanel & Igor Stravinsky (2009), a French film directed by Jan Kounen about an affair between Coco Chanel and Igor Stravinsky. Nijinsky is portrayed in scenes depicting the creation of The Rite of Spring. Nijinsky is played by Polish actor Marek Kossakowski.

=== In photography ===
- Lincoln Kirstein. Nijinsky Dancing. New York: Alfred A. Knopf, 1975.

=== In poetry ===
- The War of Vaslav Nijinsky (1981) by poet Frank Bidart
- "September 1, 1939" (1939) by poet W. H. Auden
- Mention in Leonard Cohen's poem Two Went to Sleep
- Nijinsky by Swedish poet Lars Forssell
- Mention in Soumitra Mohan's long Hindi poem, Luqman Ali (1968)
- Mentioned in the epic poem The Battlefield Where The Moon Says I Love You by Frank Stanford: "look at my legs I am the Nijinsky of dreams..."
- Nijinsky by Greek poet Giorgos Seferis
- At the Autopsy of Vaslav Nijinsky by poet Bridget Lowe (2013)
- Mention in İsmet Özel's poem Dibace
- Mention in Leopoldo María Panero's poem, Mancha azul sobre el papel (1979)

=== In novels ===
- Vaslav (2010) by Dutch novelist Arthur Japin
- The Chosen Maiden (2017) by Canadian author Eva Stachniak

=== In fine arts ===
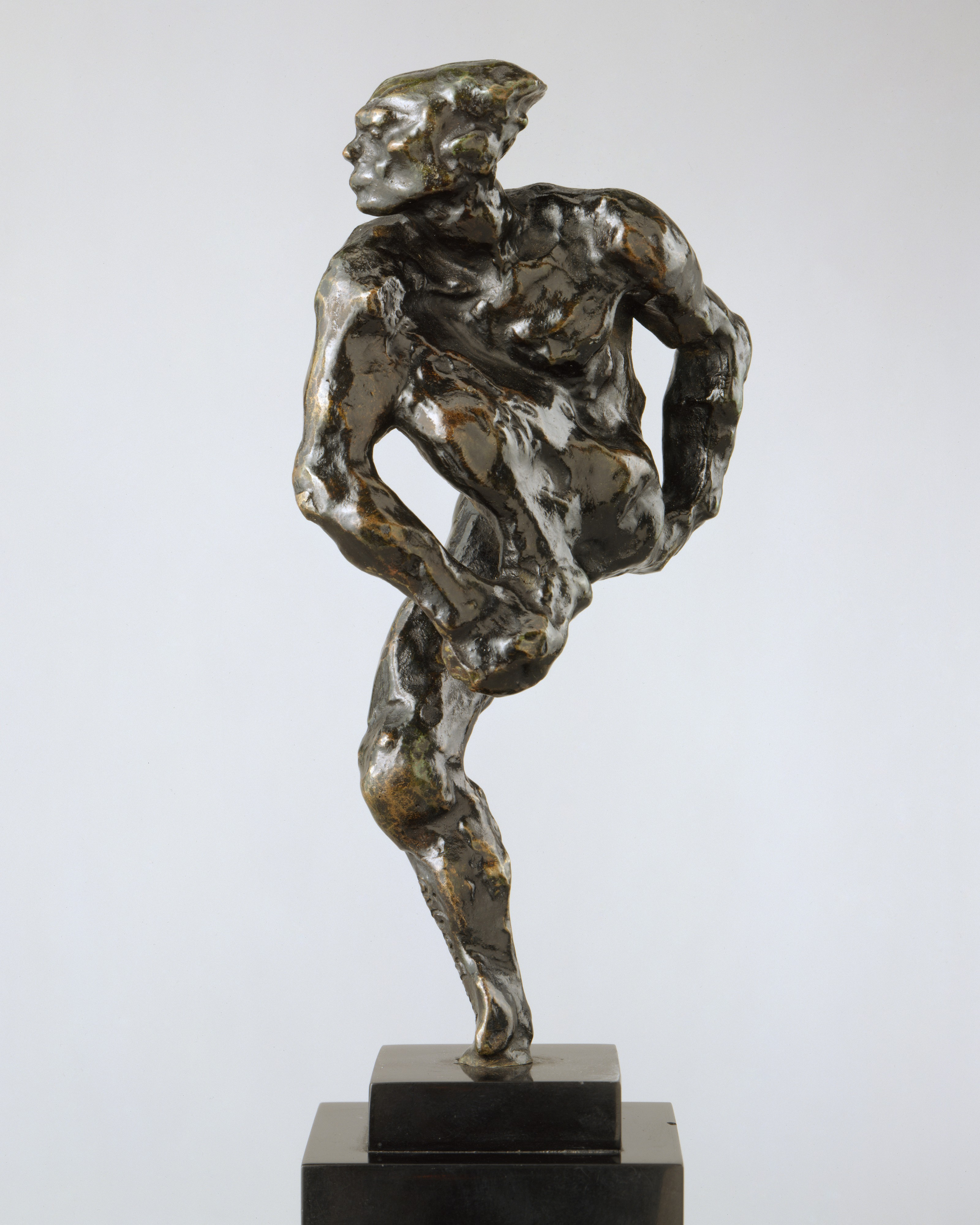
Nijinsky by Auguste Rodin

On 11 June 2011, Poland's first sculpture of the Polish/Russian dancers Vaslav Nijinsky and his sister Bronislava Nijinska was unveiled in the Teatr Wielki's foyer. It portrays them in their roles as the Faun and the Nymph from the ballet L'après-midi d'un faune. Commissioned by the Polish National Ballet, the sculpture was made in bronze by the well-known Ukrainian sculptor Giennadij Jerszow. Nijinsky was also portrayed by Auguste Rodin. It was cast posthumously in 1912.

=== In music ===
- In 2011, composer Jade Esteban Estrada wrote the song "Beautiful" for the musical, ICONS: The Lesbian and Gay History of the World, Vol. 5.
- A verse of the song "Dancing" from the album Mask (1981) by Bauhaus refers to Nijinsky "...Dancing on hallowed ground/Dancing Nijinsky style/Dancing with the lost and found...". He is also mentioned in the song "Muscle in Plastic" on the same album.
- A verse of the song "Prospettiva Nevskj" from the album Patriots (1980) by Franco Battiato quotes Nijinsky, his peculiar dancing style, and hints to his relation with Diaghilev: "poi guardavamo con le facce assenti la grazia innaturale di Nijinsky. E poi di lui si innamorò perdutamente il suo impresario e dei balletti russi " (then we were watching with emotionless faces the unnatural grace of Nijinsky. And then his manager fell desperately in love with him and the Russian Ballet)
- A verse of the song "Do the Strand" from the album For Your Pleasure (1973) by Roxy Music refers to Nijinsky: "If you feel blue/ Look through Who's Who/ See La Goulue/ And Nijinsky/ Do the Strandsky."
- On his 2010 album Varieté, English singer Marc Almond features a song called "My Nijinsky Heart" that is about wanting to bring out the dancer within.

=== In competitive skating ===
- In 2003, the Russian champion figure skater Evgeni Plushenko created a routine called "Tribute to Vaslav Nijinsky", which he performed in competitions around the world. He earned a perfect 6.0 score for artistic impression in the 2003–2004 Russian National Championship in St. Petersburg.

== See also ==
- List of dancers
- List of Russian ballet dancers
