= Jean Koning =

Dutch actor and musician (born 1976)

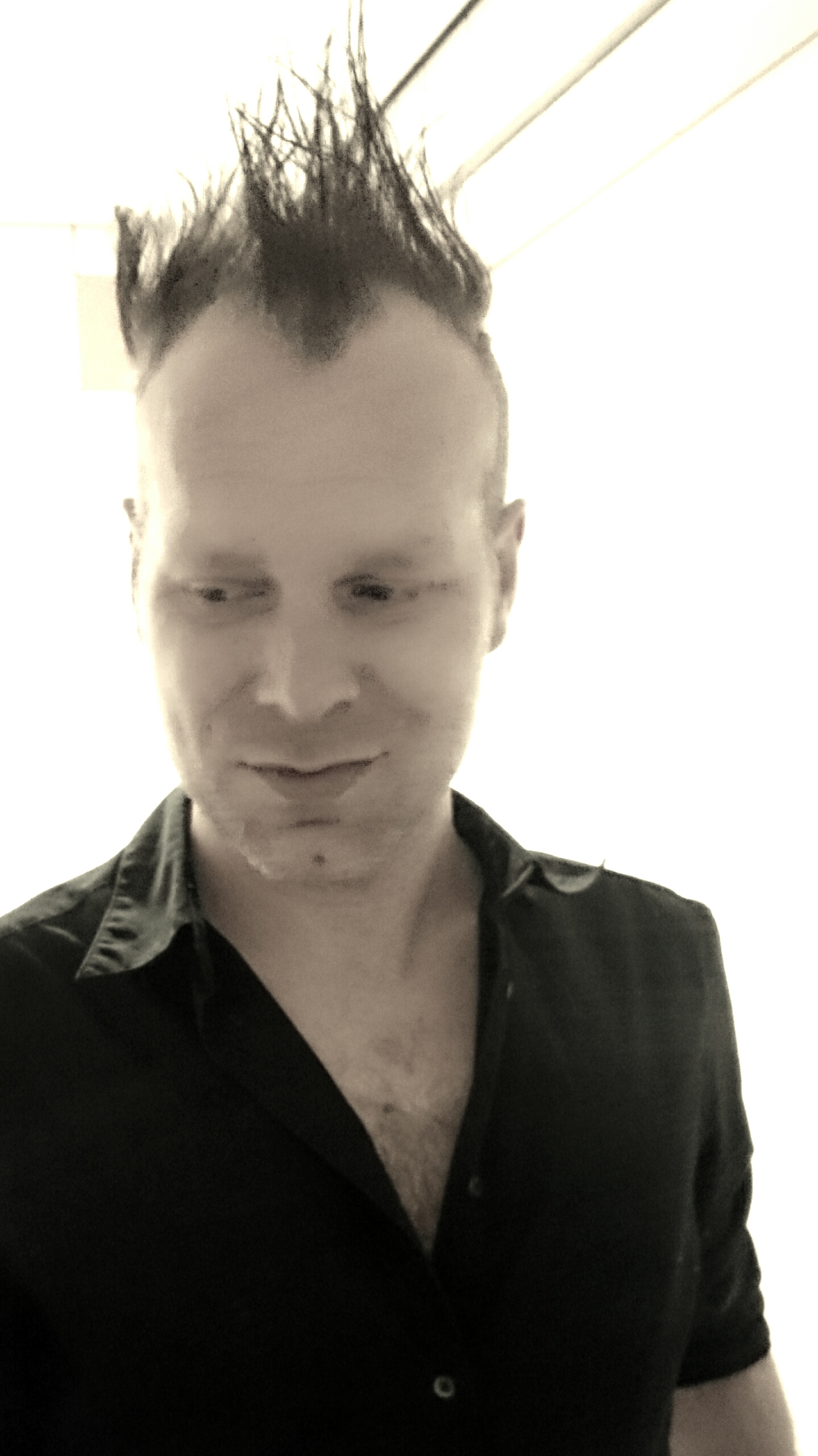
- Koning at the Black&White Ball in Amsterdam, April 2015
- Born: Jean Paul Koning; 19 April 1976 (age 50); Zaandam, Netherlands
- Occupations: Actor, musician, author
- Years active: 1985–present
- Children: Quintana Rain (2006)
- Musical career
- Genres: Alternative rock; punk rock; experimental; jazz; rock
- Instruments: Vocals; guitar; piano; organ
- Labels: Pathfinder Records, Crommania Records, Coffee&CheeseCake Records, iM Records, Out Of Office Records
- Website: www.jeankoning.nl

Jean Paul Koning (born 19 April 1976) is a Dutch actor, director, musician and author.

In the early 1990s, Koning was a model in the Amsterdam gay scene, performed as a stage actor, and played in an industrial avant-punk band called !JP, which released numerous albums. Koning is known for his outspoken views and generally sarcastic nature.

Despite his traditional actor training by Piet Teeling at the Children Theatre Academy and at the Kimball Institute, he is considered to be a method actor, known for his constant devotion to and research of his roles.

In his acclaimed book Visions, he writes about his personal life in both Amsterdam and New York. Describing political issues, disappointing love affairs and drug abuse, in a witty voice, With Visions Koning reached a widespread audience. Koning returned to writing with two Dutch novels, Noppen and Anoniem, which are written from a fictional character's point of view, but seem to deal with personal grief at the same time.

== Early life ==
Jean Koning was born in Zaandam, Netherlands. At an early age, Koning's parents moved further north to the hamlet West-Knollendam.

According to genealogy, conducted for the Dutch TROS network, for their program Allemaal Familie, he is a cousin of performer Danny de Munk.

== Career ==
=== Theatre ===
Halfway during the 1980s, Koning enrolled into the Children Theatre Academy in Purmerend. His first part was as a party-guest in a French Play, which played local theatres. After that, Koning made a move to Amsterdam where he began working with numerous theatre-companies.

During the artistic explosion in the 1990s, he further developed his career as stage-actor and performed in numerous (mostly experimental) plays. In 1998 he shifted his acting-career to a lower level, focusing mainly on his music-career.

In 2005 he returned to stage-acting. In 2006 he played Mikheil Saakashvili in Het Meisje En De Macht by theatre-company Toetssteen. He played this part with his back facing the audience, which enhanced his obscurity and waywardness as an actor.

In 2013 he played both Borg in Het Tijdgat and Lev Sergeyevich Termen in "LEV", two of his most appreciated parts in the theatre.

In 2014 and 2015 he toured with the critically acclaimed solo-play Étonne-Moi, in which he played the legendary Vaslav Nijinsky. Stated to be a convincing and fascinating play with a wide variety of facial expressions and body language. Koning elevated the play to a stage-filling spectacle.

=== Music ===
Koning played electric guitar and sang in garage band !JP. Halfway during the 1990s, Koning made a shift to New York City, to pursuit a solo career in music.

In 2003 Koning starts a musical side project called ILUNGA PI. This band takes the avant garde songs from the !JP catalogue and plays them in a more commercial sounding way. That same year, this project-band wins the NH Glorie Public Choice Award for best band and best performance.

In 2009 Koning signed with the New York City based independent label Coffee&CheeseCake Records and commences his solo-career in 2010 with Man Enough To Be A Woman, on Eden Records. In 2011 Koning released his Coffee&CheeseCake-debut, Wake Up in L.A. In 2012, Koning was one of the musicians performing during the election campaign for Dutch political party Groen Links. With his third album Industrial City In The Clouds, Koning focused on a more commercial sound. The album contains songs about the history of his birth town and was highly appreciated.

== Stage ==
- De Verjaardag (1985)
- Op Stap (1988)
- De Kus (1993)
- Intimacies (1993)
- Jungle (1994)
- Dracula (1995)
- Hair (1996)
- Romeo And Juliet (1996)
- Jesus Christ Superstar (1997)
- Mijn Jongen (2005)
- Het Meisje en de Macht (2006)
- Bernlef's De Pianoman (2007)
- The Sound of Music (2009)
- Sebastiaan (2010)
- Missie Macoco (2011)
- Superhelden (2011)
- Het Tijdgat (2013)
- LEV (2013)
- Zolo & Lotus (2014)
- Étonne-Moi (2014)
- Elegies for Angels, Punks and Raging Queens (2014)
- Tussen Het Stro (2015)
- Open Wond (2015)
- Peek (2015)
- Drang (2016)
- Slangenkuil (2018)
- Tussen De Koffiesessies Door (2022)
- Een Duivels Dilemma (2023)

== Film ==
=== Actor ===
- The Scent of Men (1995)
- Post (2009)
- Schieten we nog? (2010)
- De Kelder (2012)
- Grieved (2013)
- Edward (2014)
- Open Wond (2016)

=== Writer/director ===
Feature films

- Grieved (2013)

Short films

- Alice, Go Home (2003)
- Dear City… (2013)

== Discography ==
=== Albums ===
==== !JP ====
- Man Sized Sex, Ted (1990, Pathfinder Records)
- Anatomy of Addiction (1994, Crommania Records)
- I Need Somebody Smarter Than Me (1997, Crommania Records)
- Everybody Else's Boy (2000, Crommania Records)
- A Singer Must Die (2002, Crommania Records)
- L'Hôtel Du Freaks (2003, Crommania Records)
- Surrender The Pink (2004, Crommania Records)
- Notes From Purgatory (2006, Crommania Records)
- On Line European Playground (2009, Crommania Records
- Forbidden Pleasures Shouted to the Moon Over Venice Beach (2010, Crommania Records)
- Once Freak Show (2016, Crommania Records)
- Selected Surrenders (2016, Crommania Records)
- Selected Singers (2017, Crommania Records)

==== Solo ====
- Man Enough To Be A Woman (2010, Eden Records)
- Wake Up in L.A. (2011, Coffee&CheeseCake Records)
- Industrial City in the Clouds (2013, Coffee&CheeseCake Records)
- theLOTUStape (2014, Coffee&CheeseCake Records)
- From The Hermit's Bedroom (2017, Out Of Office Records/RouteNote Records)
- Seven Shots of Whisky and Then Try to Sing It - a Live Recording (2017, Out Of Office Records/RouteNote Records)
- Lingo: Life Legend Lost (2018, iM/Out Of Office Records)
- Industrial City RMXS (2018, Out Of Office Records/RouteNote Records)
- Mineo (2020, Out Of Office Records/RouteNote Records)
- Poor Jericho (2021, Out Of Office Records)
- Faraday Cage (2024, Out Of Office Records)

==== Compilations ====
- SAEN - a collection (by !JP) (2007, Crommania Records)
- Analog - a collection of alternatives (2012, Coffee&CheeseCake Records)
- Carbon Copy (with !JP) (2016, Out Of Office Records)
- Beinoni (2023, Record Store Day Exclusive in association with Out Of Office Records)
- Play With My Trigger (by !JP) (2024, Crommania Records/Sony Records)

=== EPs ===
- Miniatures 1: "PAIN" (2012, Coffee&CheeseCake Records)
- Miniatures 2: "An American Tale" (2012, Coffee&CheeseCake Records)
- Miniatures 3: "I Want To Take The Journey To The Devil Down Below" (2014, Coffee&CheeseCake Records)
- Nobody Knows You When You're Down And Out (2014, His Master's Voice)
- Blauw (2016, Coffee&CheeseCake Records)
- The Cause Of All My Scars R'Mix (ft. DJ Christ'Off) (2017, Out Of Office Records/RouteNote Records)
- Is That All There Is? (2018, Out Of Office Records/IM Records)
- February 12 (2020, Out Of Office Records)
- On Common Ground (2020, Out Of Office Records)

=== Singles ===
- When Doves Cry (2011, iM Records)
- SexyBack (2012, Coffee&CheeseCake Records)
- Do What I Like To Do (2012, Coffee&CheeseCake Records)
- BubbleGum (ft. Philltunes) (2012, Coffee&CheeseCake Records)
- Has He Got A Friend For Me (2015, Coffee&CheeseCake Records)
- The Cause Of All My Scars (2016, Out Of Office Records/RouteNote Records)
- Truly Love The Hunt (2017, Out Of Office Records/RouteNote Records)
- Just The Mess We Made (2017, Out Of Office Records/RouteNote Records)

== Bibliography ==
- POEM! (1994, Poems)
- Een Gewatteerde Cel (2000, Poems)
- Visions (on America) (ISBN 978-1-4092-6244-2, 2007, Autobiographical columns)
- Anoniem (ISBN 978-90-811268-4-7, 2008, Novel)
- Ceropegia Ampliata (ISBN 978-90-811268-5-4, 2008, Poems)
- Noppen (ISBN 978-1-4092-6939-7, 2009, Novel)
- Champagne& Ibuprofen (2009, Essay)
- Project Amos (ISBN 978-1-291-47576-0, 2013, Novella)
- Quotes & Thoughts (ISBN 978-1-291-47488-6, 2013, Autobiographical quotes)
- Het Collectieve Geheugen Van De Mensheid (2016, Play)
- Four Seconds of Pure, White Light (ISBN 978-0-244-91564-3, 2017, Short Story)
- Twelve Step Charlie (ISBN 978-0-244-91488-2, 2017, Memoir)
