= Anton Bon =

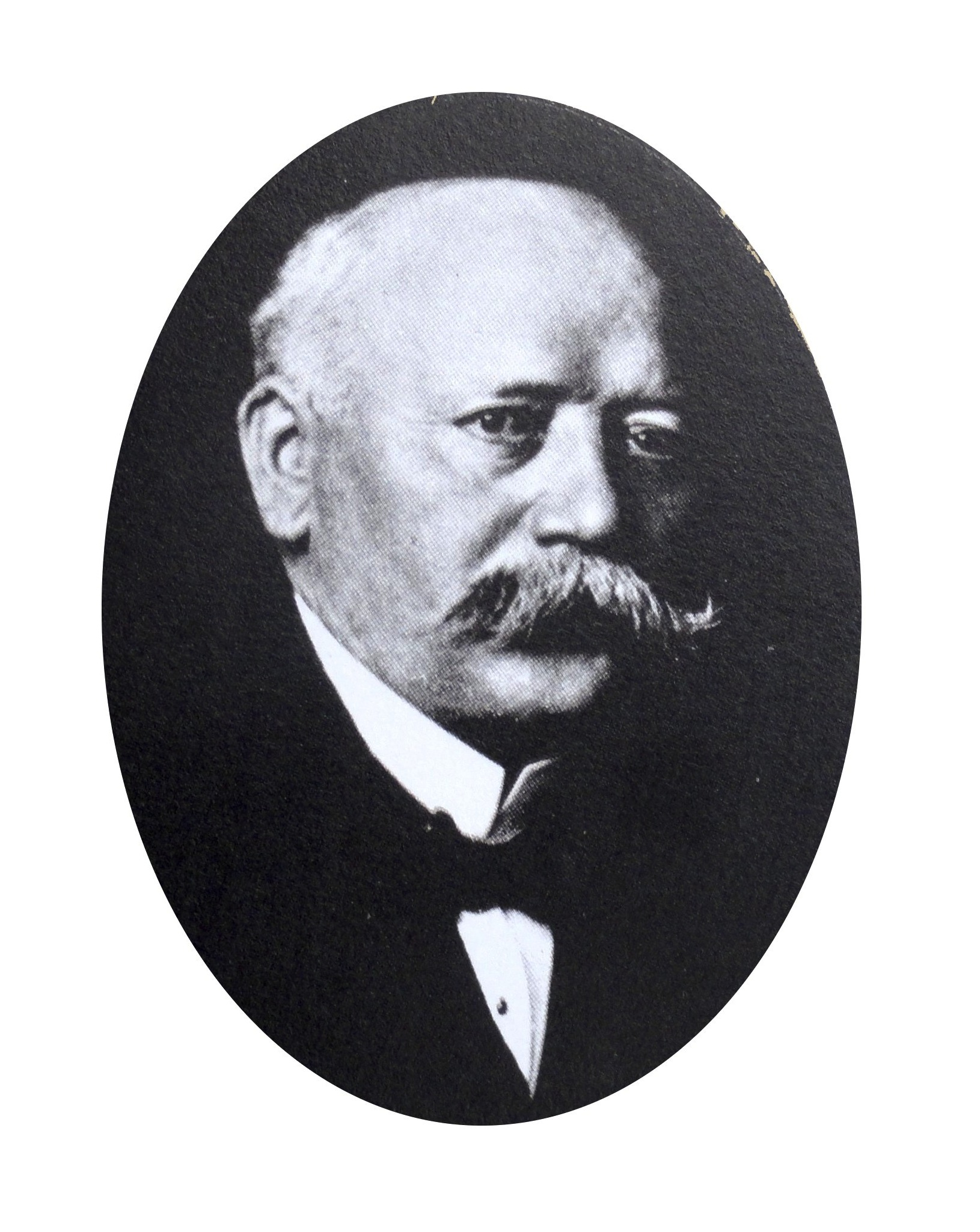
Anton Bon

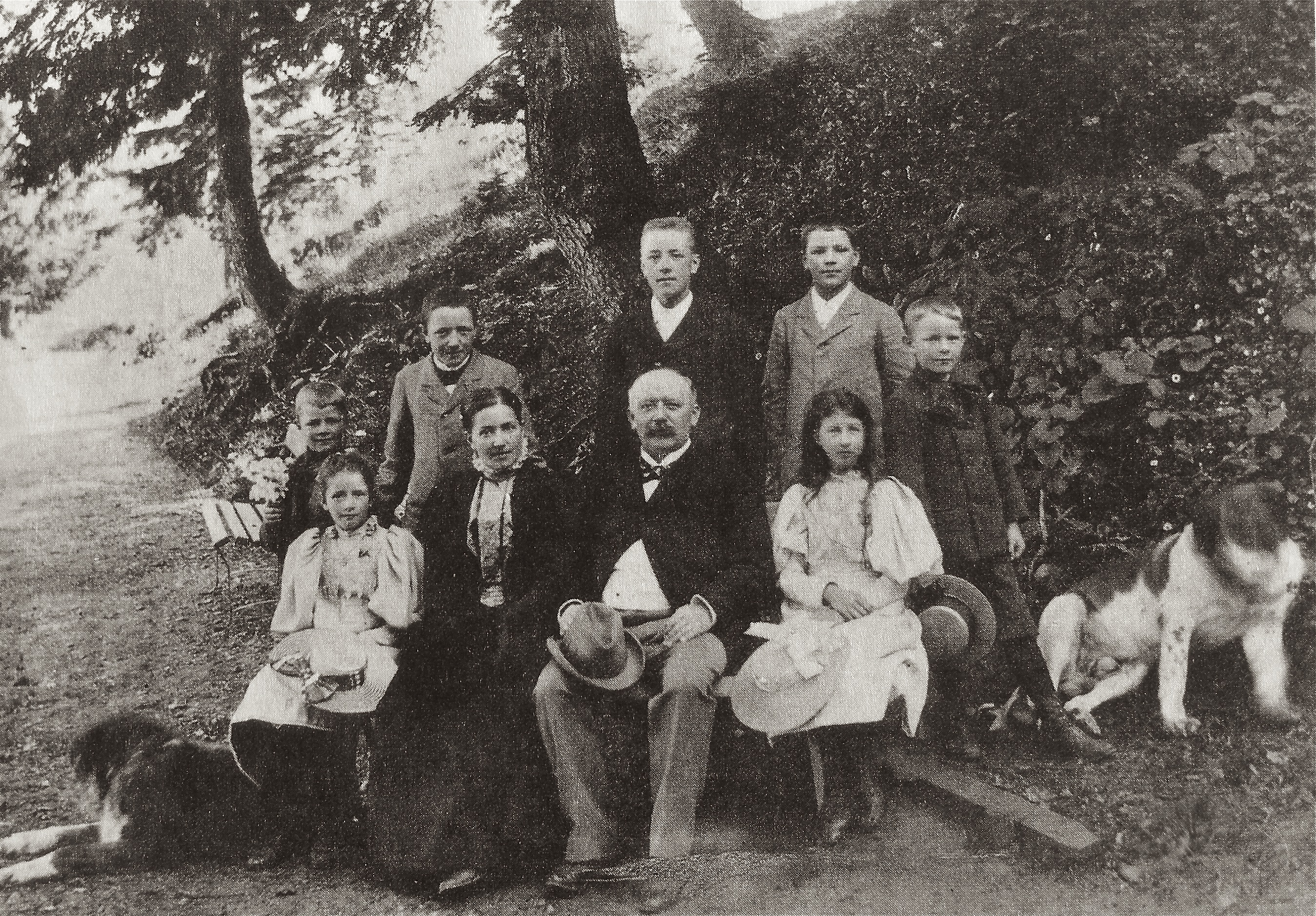
Anton Bon and family

Anton Sebastian Bon (1854–1915) was a Swiss hotelier who built the Suvretta House in St Moritz from 1911 to 1912, together with the British member of parliament (MP), Charles Sydney Goldman.

He was born in Bad Ragaz, St. Gallen, Switzerland
