= Carnaval (ballet) =

Ballet choreographed by Michel Fokine

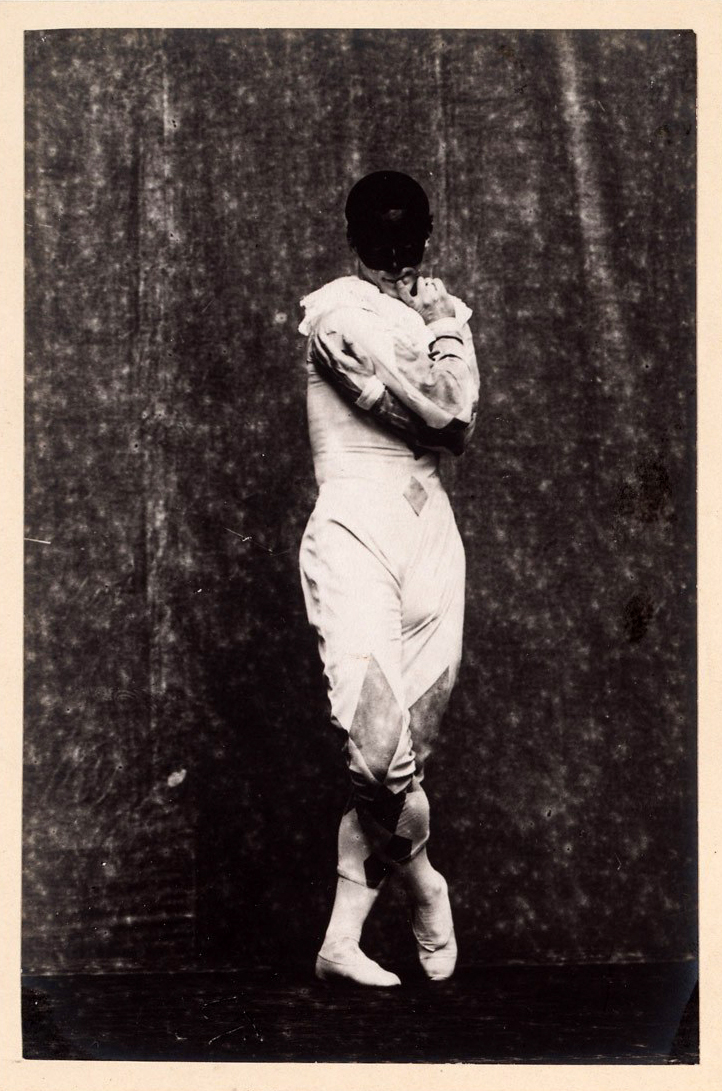
- Michel Fokine in costume for Carnaval, circa 1910
- Choreographer: Michel Fokine
- Music: Robert Schumann
- Libretto: Michel Fokine
- Premiere: 20 February 1910; Pavlov Hall, Saint Petersburg, Russia
- Original ballet company: Imperial Ballet
- Characters: Columbine; Harlequin; Chiarina; Estrella; Papillon; Pierrot; Florestan; Eusebius
- Design: Léon Bakst
- Setting: anteroom of a ballroom

Carnaval (Russian: Карнавал) is a ballet based on the music of Robert Schumann's piano suite Carnaval, Op. 9, as orchestrated by Alexander Glazunov, Nikolai Rimsky-Korsakov, Anatoly Lyadov and Alexander Tcherepnin. It was choreographed by Michel Fokine to his own libretto, with costumes designed by Léon Bakst, and premiered in Pavlovsk on 5 March (old style, 20 February) 1910.

The leading dancers of the Imperial Ballet were engaged in the production: Tamara Karsavina (Columbine), Leonid Leontiev (Harlequin), Vera Fokina (Chiarina), Ludmilla Schollar (Estrella), Bronislava Nijinska (Papillon), Vsevolod Meyerhold (Pierrot), Vasily Kiselev (Florestan), and Alexander Shiryaev (Eusebius).

The ballet became world-famous due to its production by Sergei Diaghilev's Ballets Russes (Theater des Westens, Berlin, 20 May 1910), with new sets and costumes by Bakst, with Lydia Lopokova as Columbine and Fokine himself as Harlequin.

== History ==
Carnaval was created in three spontaneous rehearsals in 1910 for a charity performance in Pavlov Hall, Saint Petersburg, to benefit the magazine Satirikon.

When Michel Fokine was approached by two young men involved in the publication (Mikhail Kornfeld, later to be its publisher, and the later-famous poet Grigory Potemkin) they gave him free rein, although they mentioned that the theme of the event was to be carnival. The choreographer immediately thought of Schumann's Carnaval suite for piano, which he had long admired.

On 14 September 1933, the ballet was revived in London by the Ballet Russe de Monte-Carlo (staged by Woizikovsky) for Alexandra Danilova (appearing as Columbine). In 1937, it was staged by the Vic-Wells Ballet with Margot Fonteyn playing the role of Columbine.

== Score ==
The score has musical references to Frédéric Chopin and Niccolò Paganini, literary ones to the four commedia dell'arte characters Harlequin, Columbina, Pierrot and Pantalone, and stage directions written in after it was completed.

There are also autobiographical references to Ernestine von Fricken, with whom Schumann was in love when he was very young, and to Clara Schumann, his wife, and in the final section of the music, entitled "Marche des Davidsbündler contre les Philistines", to the composer's advocacy of the "new" art, as against the conservation of the old. The Davidsbündler was an artistic society invented by Schumann as a foil to the conservative musical establishment.

== Libretto ==
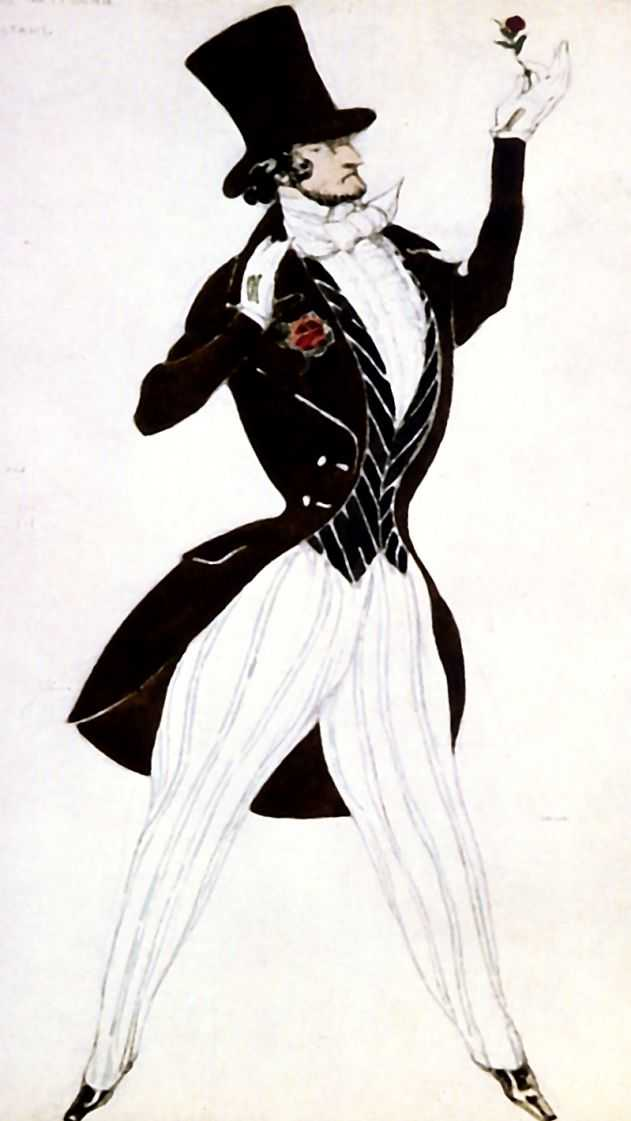
Costume sketch by Léon Bakst, for the 1910 production

The libretto was put together by Michel Fokine and Léon Bakst and has no real plot; rather it is a series of light, humorous, and joyous incidents combined with some moments of poignancy and an undercurrent of satire.

The four characters of the commedia are complemented by Florestan, representing the impulsive side of Schumann's nature, Eusebius, the thoughtful solitary side, Estrella (Ernestine), Chiarina (Clara), Papillon, a fluttering lady, six light-hearted couples, and four Philistines.

For the gallant males, coquettish females, and lovers who teasingly accept and reject each other, Fokine devised numerous pas de deux, pas de trois and pas seuls.

== Costumes and sets ==
They illustrate another instance where the role of the designer, in this case Bakst, was of utmost importance.

His sketches for the costumes gave Fokine further inspiration for the finely etched characters he created. The simple set—the ante-room of a ballroom delineated by a curtain running all around the stage and up to the flies, with two chandeliers and two small striped sofas—as well as the costumes, were designed in the style of Biedermeier.

Even the traditional commedia dell'arte figures were altered slightly to fit this viewpoint. The set had evidently the effect of making the dancers appear smaller – thus making the audience feel even more strongly that they were watching a finely tuned miniature.

== Analysis ==
Carnaval seems to have been the most delicate, most exquisite ballet Michel Fokine ever created, as well as the most difficult to pinpoint.

As was the case with many of his works, the roles depended to a large degree upon the talents of the original performers, and if one looks at just the steps (except for the one Harlequin solo) they are almost simplistic. It was the infusion of lightness, gaiety, coyness, and self-absorption, combined with an underlying sadness—all of which must be contributed by the dancers—that resulted in what most critics of the time regarded as a most effective adaptation of Schumann's music and characters.

Recent attempts to reconstruct the work in England, Sweden, and the United States have had varying degrees of success. This is because the roles must be created from within each individual performer, not from externally imposed steps or gestures. They require someone like Fokine himself to elicit this from the dancers – an almost impossible task.

In the middle of the 1930s, Fokine complained that all the delicacy and charm disappeared from the Carnaval "because the world had changed and the woman was not the same". Fokine explained: "In the past, the woman was saying 'Don't touch me!' and now their whole appearance says, 'Touch me' or even 'I beg you'."
