= Jeux =

1913 ballet by Claude Debussy

- Tamara Karsavina, Vaslav Nijinsky and Ludmilla Schollar in Jeux
- Choreographer: Vaslav Nijinsky
- Music: Claude Debussy
- Premiere: 15 May 1913; Paris
- Original ballet company: Ballets Russes
- Design: Léon Bakst

Jeux (Games) is a ballet written by Claude Debussy. Described as a "poème dansé" (literally a "danced poem"), it was written for Sergei Diaghilev's Ballets Russes with choreography by Vaslav Nijinsky. Debussy initially objected to the scenario but reconsidered the commission when Diaghilev doubled the fee. Debussy wrote the score quickly, from mid-August to mid-September 1912. Robert Orledge has analysed the chronology of Debussy's composition and preserved manuscripts of the score.

Jeux premiered on 15 May 1913 at the Théâtre des Champs-Élysées, Paris, conducted by Pierre Monteux. The work was not well received and was soon eclipsed by Stravinsky's The Rite of Spring, which was premiered two weeks later by Diaghilev's company.

The first commercial recording was made by Victor de Sabata with the Orchestra Stabile Accademica di Santa Cecilia in 1947. A critical edition of the score, prepared by Pierre Boulez and Myriam Chimènes, was published in 1988.

There are about sixty different tempo markings in the work, enough for Émile Vuillermoz to describe the score as changing "speed and nuance every two measures". The thematic motifs of Jeux are likewise very short, often two measures long or constructed from two single-measure building blocks. L.D. Berman has analysed Jeux in the context of Debussy's earlier Prélude à l'après-midi d'un faune. Jann Pasler has analysed in detail Debussy's motivic construction.

The piece is scored for 2 piccolos, 2 flutes, 3 oboes, English horn, 3 clarinets, bass clarinet, 3 bassoons, sarrusophone, 4 horns, 4 trumpets, 3 trombones, tuba, timpani, triangle, tambourine, cymbals, xylophone, celesta, 2 harps, and strings.

== Scenario ==
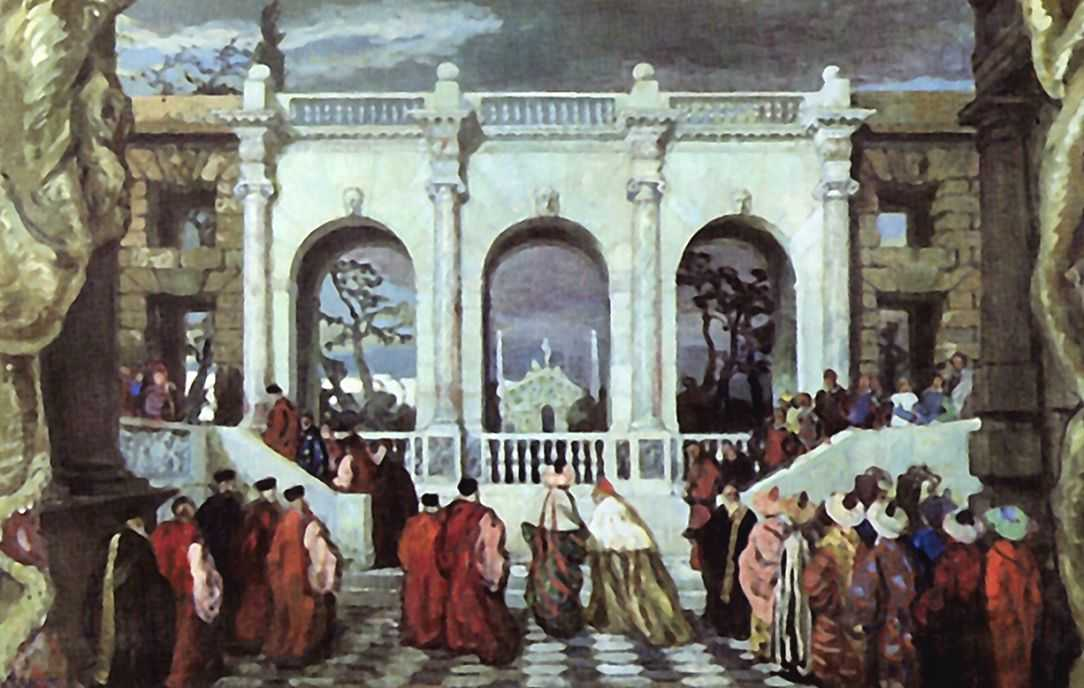
"Venetian holiday in the 16th century." Set design by Alexandre Benois for an unrealized production of Jeux

According to Nijinsky's Diaries, made during the weeks before his psychological breakdown, Diaghilev intended the music to describe a homosexual encounter between three young men, and Nijinsky wanted to include an airplane crash. The final version of the story involved a man, two girls, and a game of tennis. The scenario was described to the audience at the premiere as follows:

The scene is a garden at dusk; a tennis ball has been lost; a boy and two girls are searching for it. The artificial light of the large electric lamps shedding fantastic rays about them suggests the idea of childish games: they play hide and seek, they try to catch one another, they quarrel, they sulk without cause. The night is warm, the sky is bathed in pale light; they embrace. But the spell is broken by another tennis ball thrown in mischievously by an unknown hand. Surprised and alarmed, the boy and girls disappear into the nocturnal depths of the garden.

== Bibliography ==
- Nijinsky's Bloomsbury Ballet: Reconstruction of Dance and Design for Jeux, by Millicent Hodson, Pendragon Press, 2008. ISBN 978-1-57647-042-8
