= Léon Bakst =

Russian painter (1866–1924)

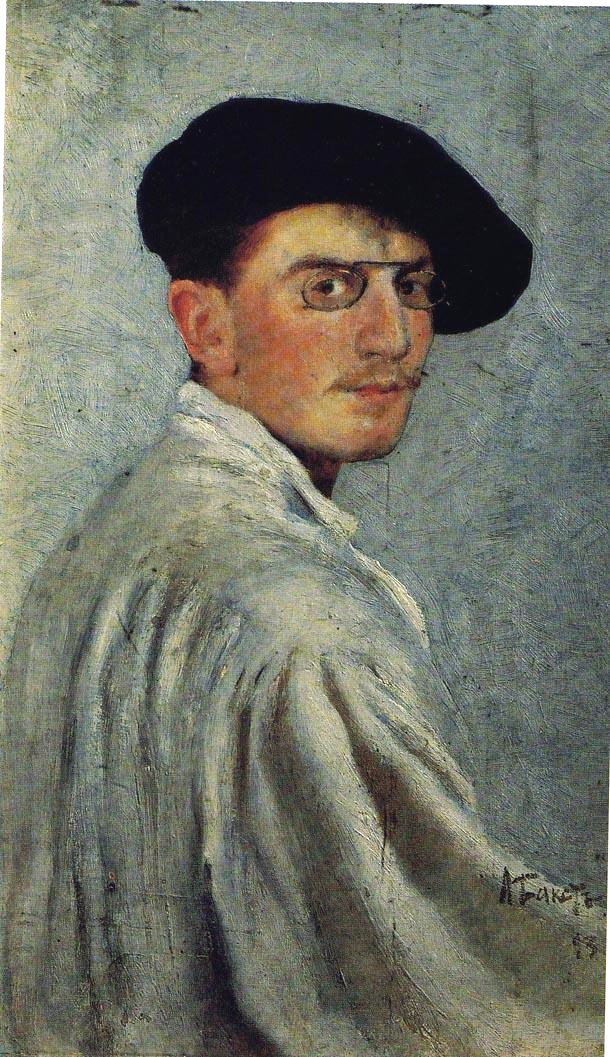
- Self-Portrait, 1893, oil on cardboard, 34 × 21 cm; Russian Museum, St. Petersburg
- Born: Leyb-Khaim Izrailevich Rosenberg; 27 January 1866; Grodno, Russian Empire
- Died: 27 December 1924 (aged 58); Rueil-Malmaison, France
- Education: Imperial Academy of Arts
- Movement: Modernist, Orientalist themes
- Spouse: Lyubov Tretyakova (m. 1903; sep. 1907)
- Children: André Bakst

Léon (Lev) Samoylovich Bakst (Russian: Леон (Лев) Самойлович Бакст), born Leyb-Khaim Izrailevich Rosenberg (Note: Russian: Лейб-Хаим Израилевич Розенберг; Yiddish: לײב־חיים יזרעיעװיטש ראזענבערג.) (8 February [O.S. 27 January] 1866 – 27 December 1924), was a Russian painter and scene and costume designer of Jewish origin. He was a member of the Sergei Diaghilev circle and the Ballets Russes, for which he designed exotic, richly coloured sets and costumes. He designed the décor for such productions as Carnaval (1910), Spectre de la rose (1911), Daphnis and Chloe (1912), The Sleeping Princess (1921) and others.

== Early life ==
Leyb-Khaim Izrailevich (later Samoylovich) Rosenberg was born in Grodno, Grodno Governorate of the Russian Empire (now Belarus) into a middle-class Jewish family. As his grandfather was an exceptional tailor, the Tsar gave him a very good position, and he had a huge and wonderful house in Saint Petersburg. Later, when Leyb's parents moved to the capital, he would visit his grandfather's house every Saturday. He said that he had been very impressed as a youth by that house, always returning with pleasure. At the young age of twelve, he won a drawing contest and decided to become a painter. However, the parents disapproved of it and even threw away his paints.

Following the divorce and remarriage of his parents, Bakst found it impossible to live with his new stepmother. Consequently, he moved into a rented apartment with his three siblings (two sisters and a brother). As the eldest child, he assumed financial responsibility for the family, supporting them by taking on various painting commissions and working as a book illustrator. After completing his studies at the gymnasium, he attempted to enter the St. Petersburg Academy of Arts; however, he initially failed the entrance examination. He was permitted to attend classes as an auditor (non-credit student) until he eventually gained full admission in 1883.

At the time of his first exhibition (1889) he took the surname of Bakst, though the origin of the pseudonym is still unclear. There are at least three versions, according to the main one, his mother's grandmother had the maiden name Bakster. Alexander Benois, a life-long friend of Leon, recalled that 'Leo gave a prolonged and confusing explanation that the surname was taken after some of distant relatives'.

At the beginning of the 1890s, Bakst exhibited his works with the Society of Watercolourists. From 1893 to 1897 he lived in Paris, where he studied at the Académie Julian. He still often visited Saint Petersburg. After the mid-1890s, Bakst became a member of the circle of writers and artists formed by Sergei Diaghilev and Benois, who in 1899 founded the influential periodical Mir iskusstva, meaning "World of Art". His graphics for this publication brought him fame.

== Career ==
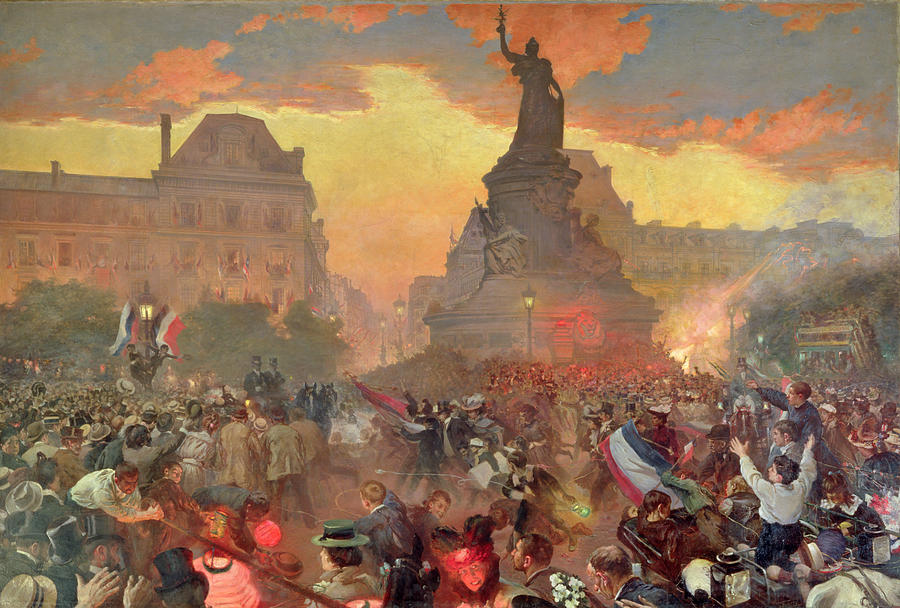
Carnival in Paris in Honour of the Russian Navy; c. 20th-century.

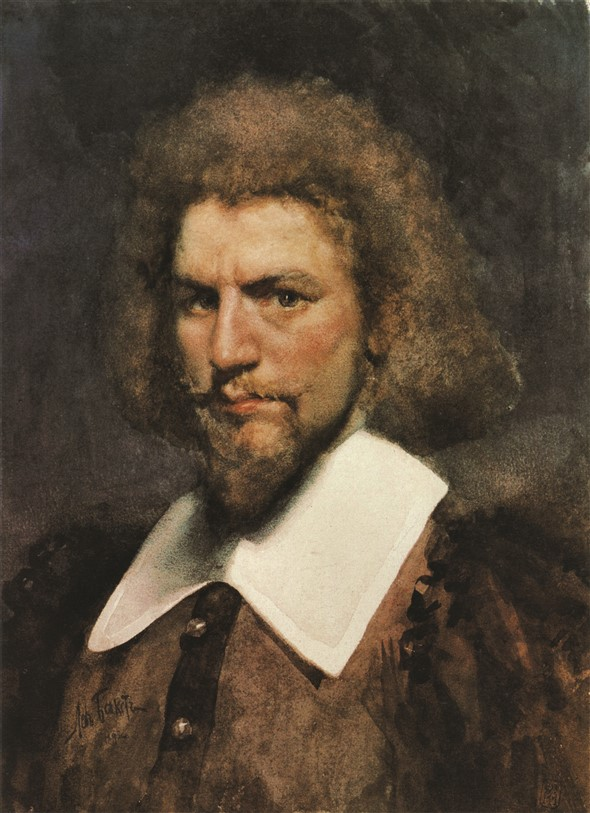
Uriel da Costa (1897), an imaginary portrait of the 17th century critic of contemporary religious orthodoxies, was one of Léon Bakst's earliest paintings

Bakst continued painting, producing portraits of Filipp Malyavin (1899), Vasily Rozanov (1901), Andrei Bely (1905), Zinaida Gippius (1906). He also worked as an art teacher for the children of Grand Duke Vladimir Alexandrovich of Russia. In 1902, he took a commission from Tsar Nicholas II to paint Admiral Avellan and Russian sailors arriving in Paris, a painting he started there, during the celebrations from the 17 to 25 October 1893. However, it took him 8 years to finish this work.

In 1898, he showed his works in the Diaghilev-organized First Exhibition of Russian and Finnish Artists; in World of Art exhibitions, as well as the Munich Secession, exhibitions of the Union of Russian Artists, etc. During the Russian Revolution of 1905, Bakst worked for the magazines Zhupel, Adskaya Pochta, Mir Iskusstva (magazine), and Satirikon, then for an art magazine called Apollon.

Beginning in 1909, Bakst worked mostly as a stage-designer, designing sets for Greek tragedies. In 1908, he gained attention as a scene-painter for Diaghilev with the Ballets Russes. He produced scenery for Cléopâtre (1909), Scheherazade (1910), Carnaval (1910), Narcisse (1911), Le Spectre de la Rose (1911), L'après-midi d'un faune (1912) and Daphnis et Chloé (1912). During this time, Bakst lived in western Europe because, as a Jew, he did not have the right to live permanently outside the Pale of Settlement in the Russian Empire [needs references as inconsistent with his full ability to live and work in St Petersburg and other areas of the Empire. (Masters and specialists with skills were usually exempted from such limitations)].

Selected stage designs

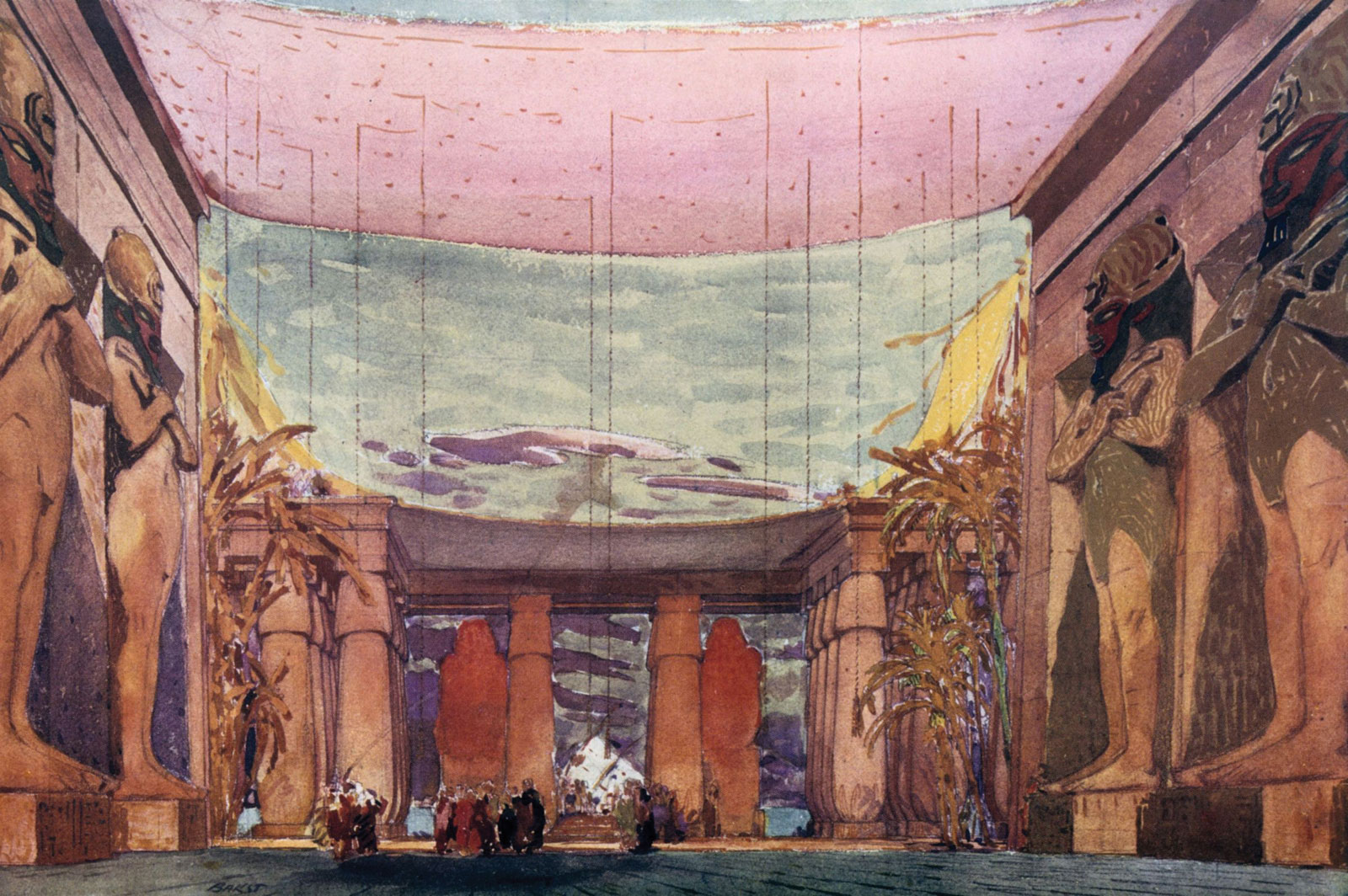
For Cléopâtre by Mikhail Fokine; 1910.

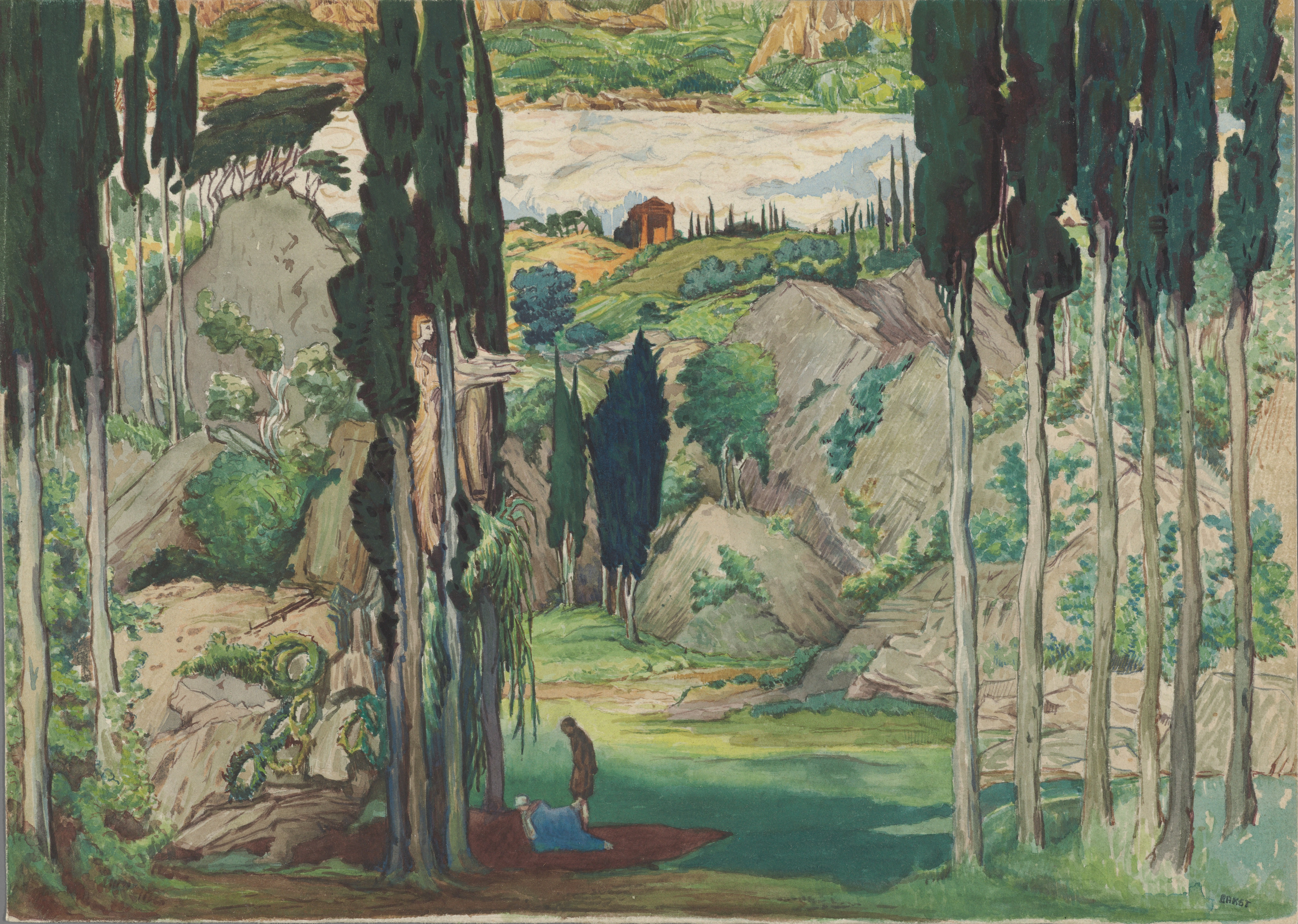
For Daphnis et Chloé by Maurice Ravel; 1912, watercolour on paper, 19×27 cm, Houghton Library.

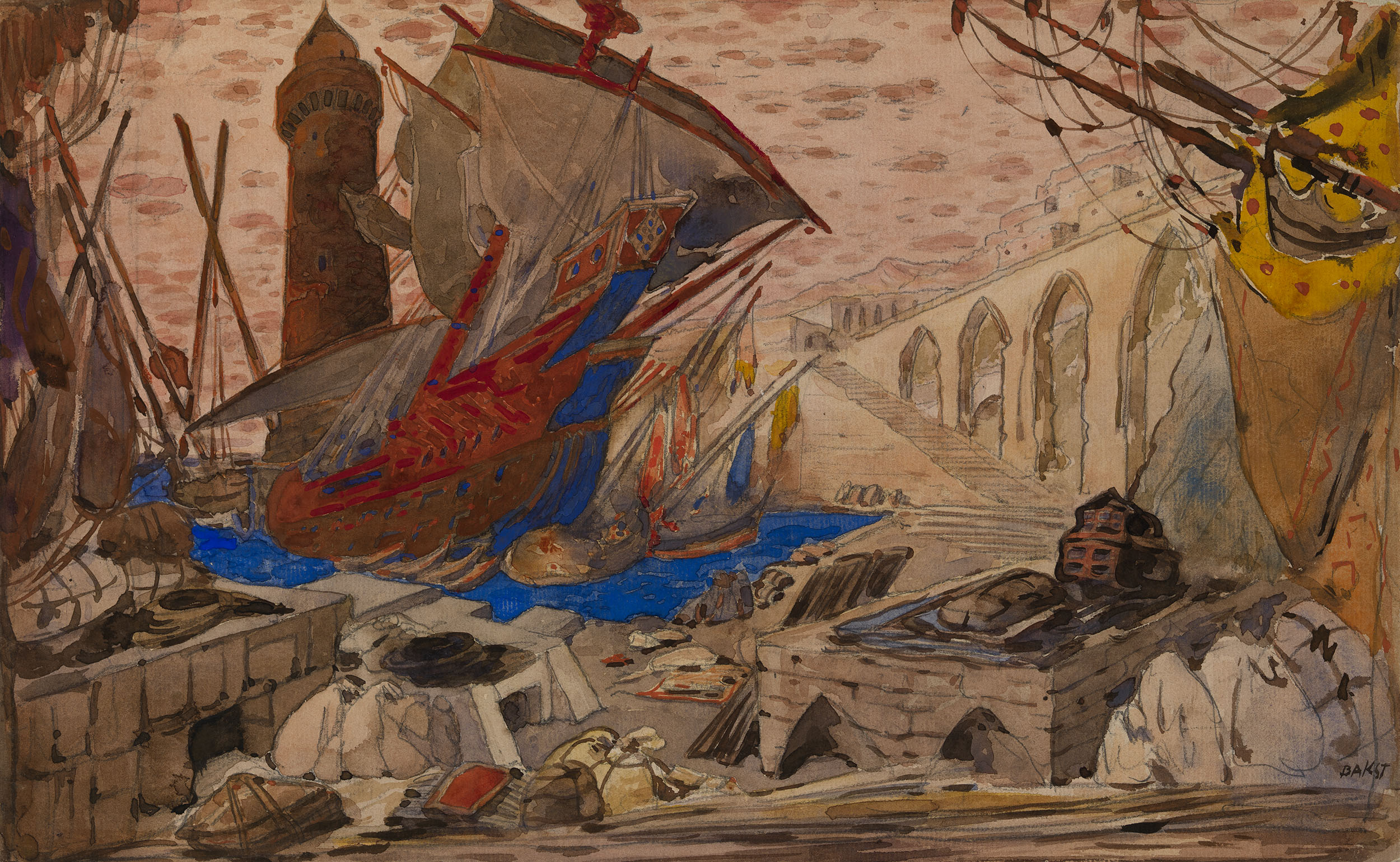
For La Pisanelle où la Mort parfumée by Gabriele D'Annunzio; 1913, pencil, watercolour and gouache on cardboard, 24×39 cm, private collection.

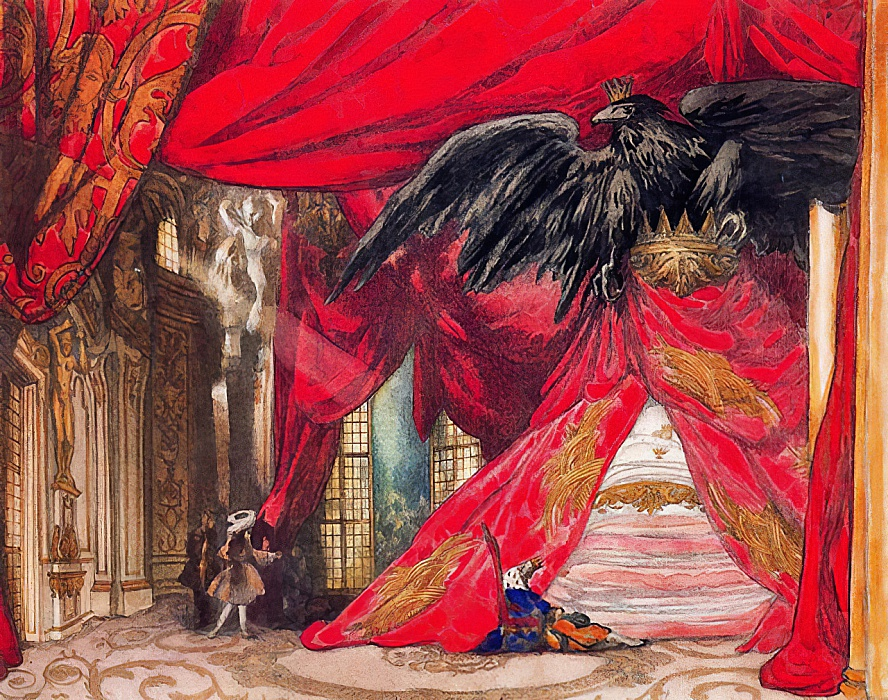
The Sleeping Beauty by Pyotr Ilyich Tchaikovsky; 1921, pencil and watercolour on paper, 48×67 cm, Thyssen-Bornemisza Museum.

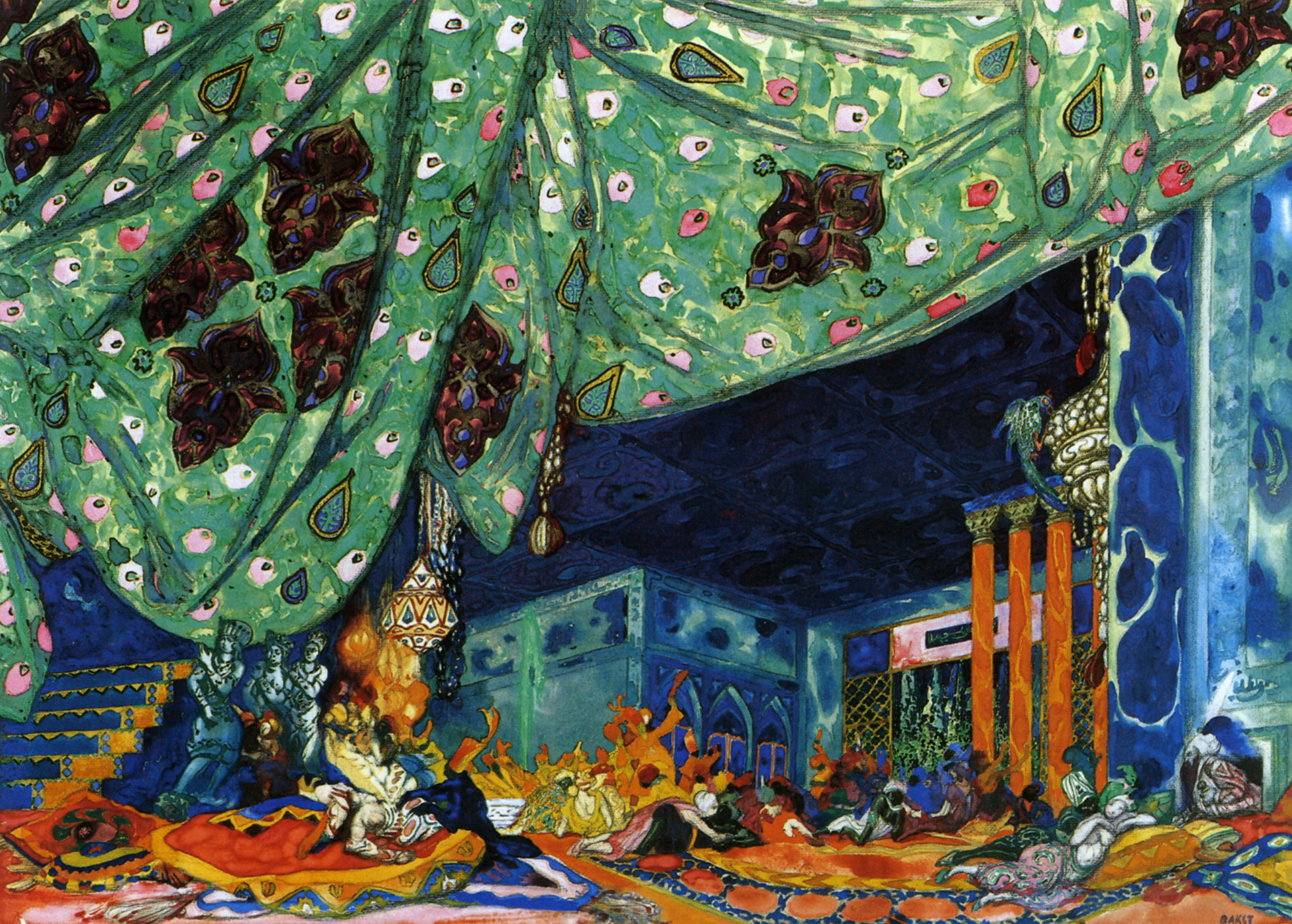
For Scheherazade by Nikolai Rimsky-Korsakov; 1916.
Selected costume designs

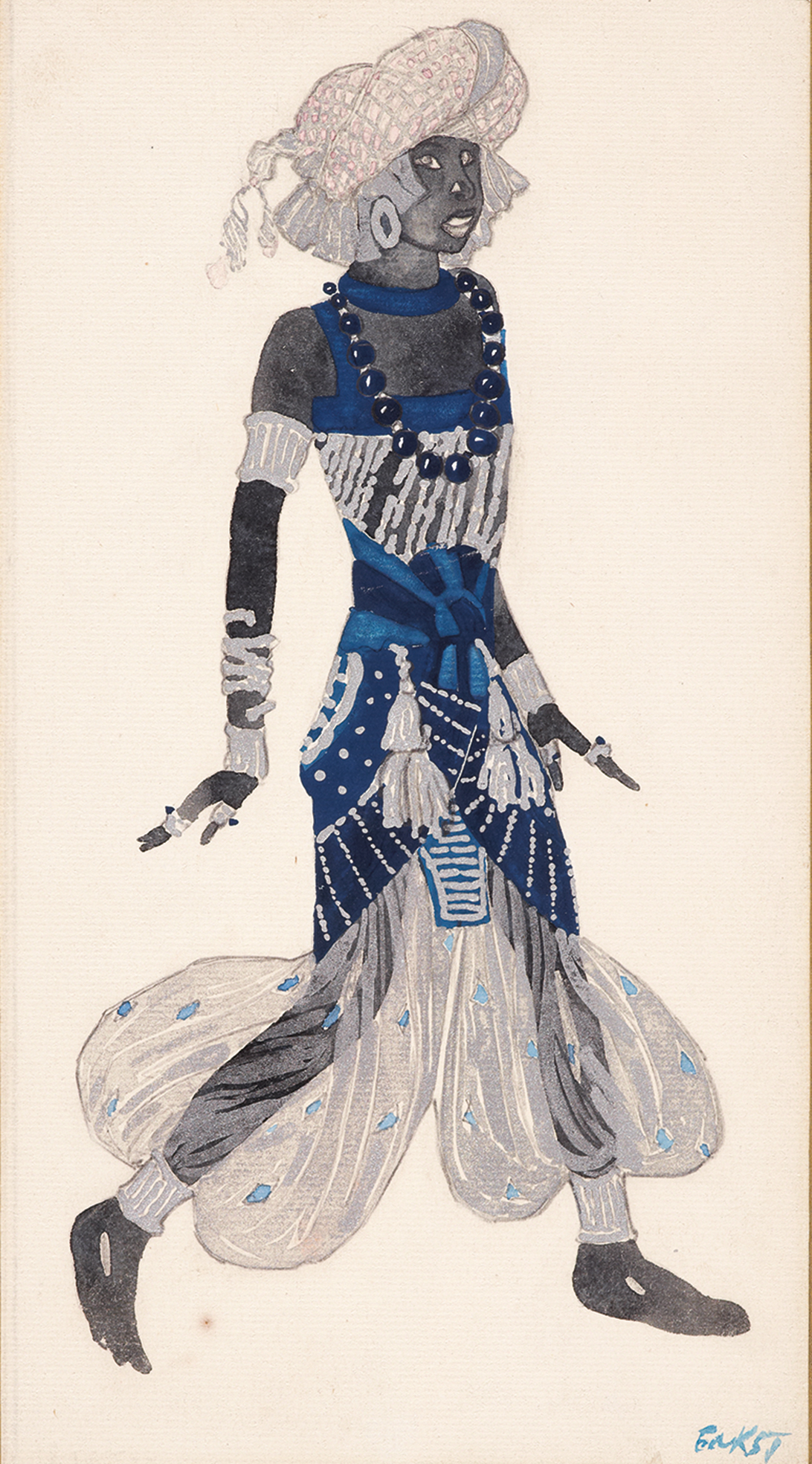
For the Negro Boy in Scheherazade by Nikolai Rimsky-Korsakov; 1910.

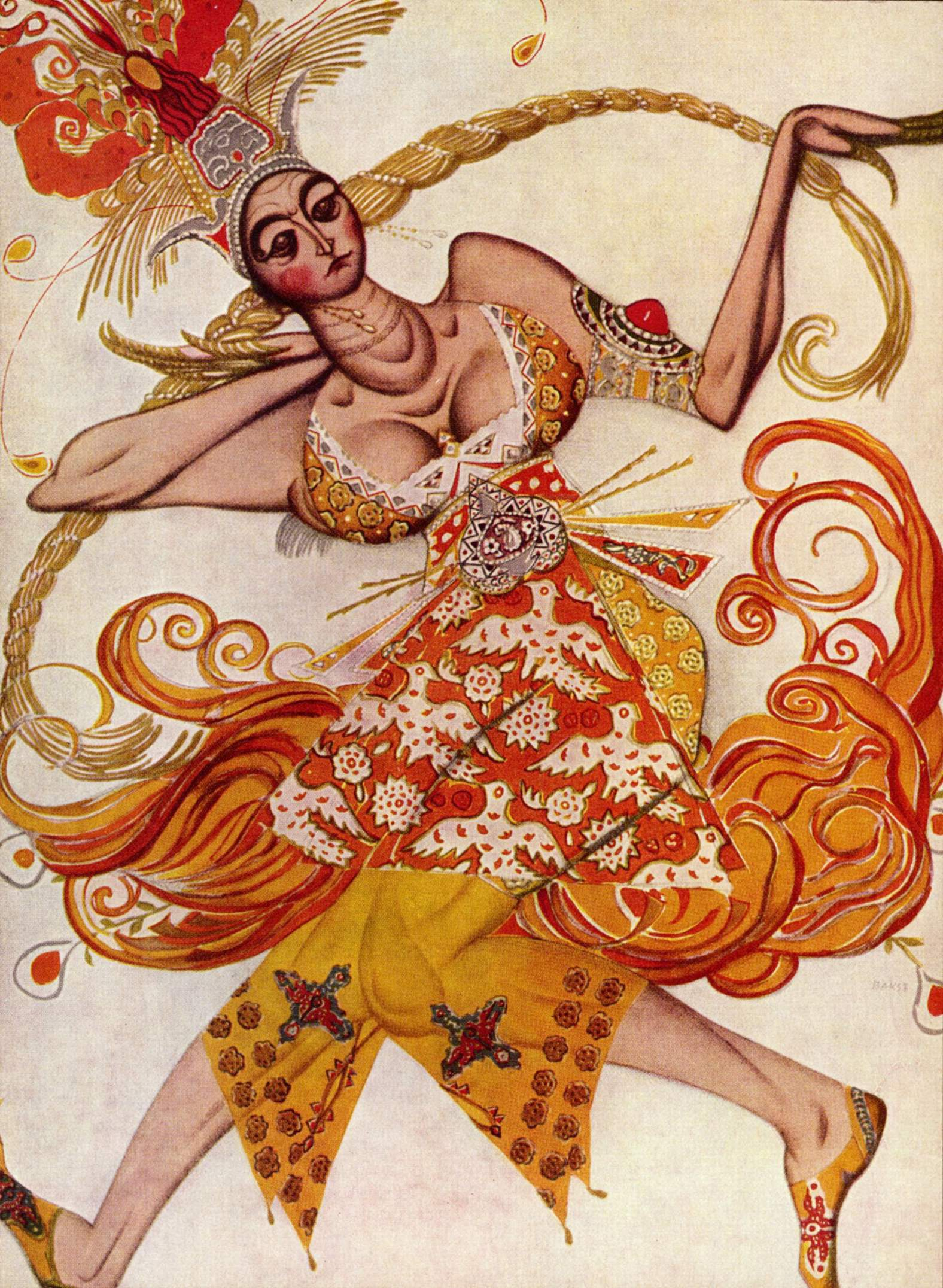
For the Firebird in The Firebird; 1910.

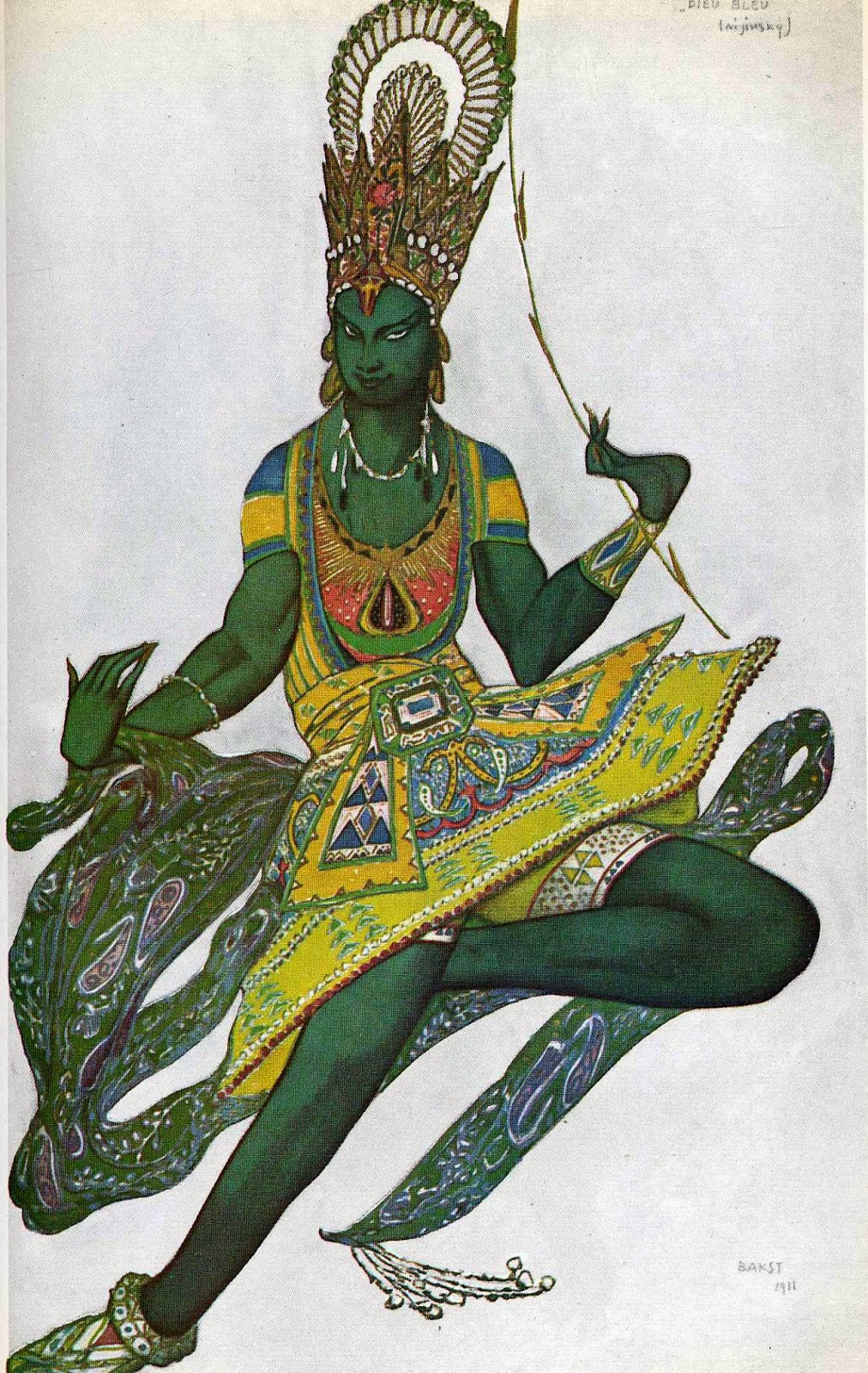
For The Blue God in Le Dieu bleu by Reynaldo Hahn; 1911.

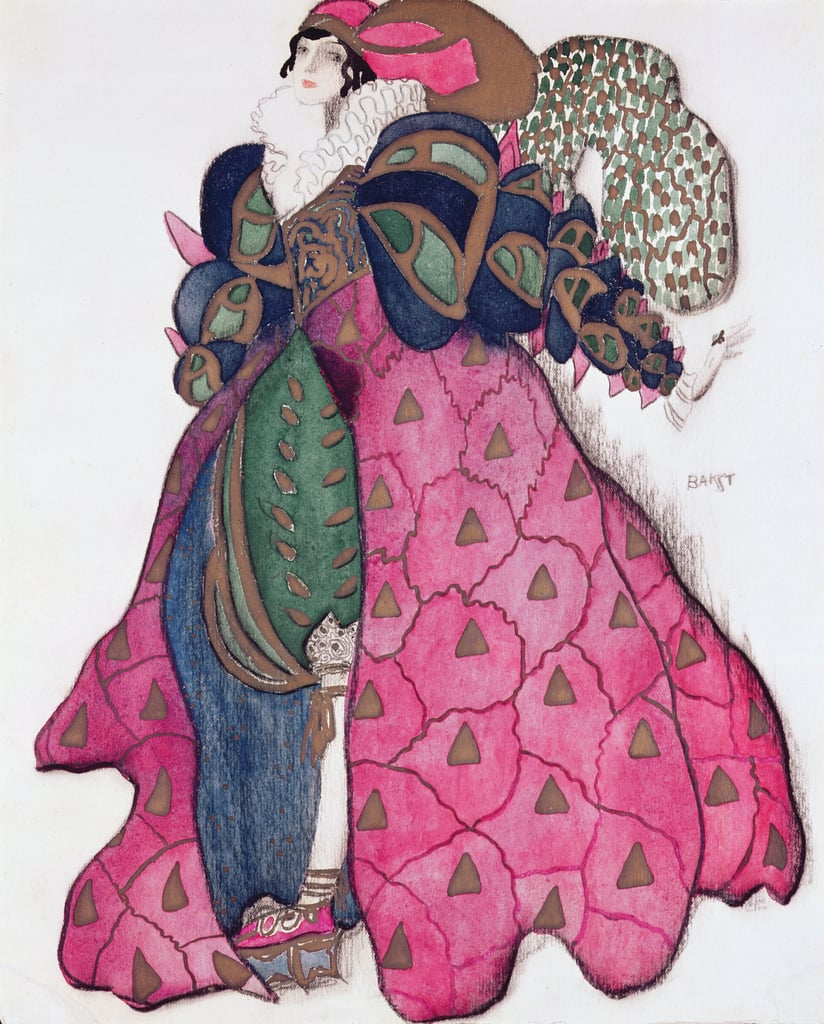
For Josephslegende by Hugo von Hofmannsthal and Harry Graf Kessler; 1914, private collection.

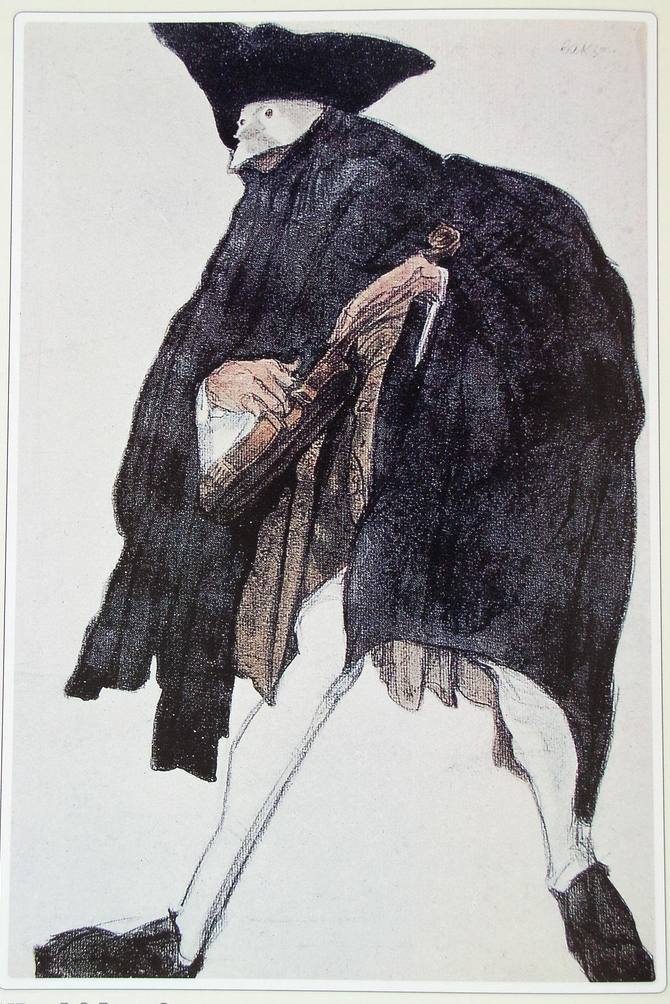
For the Masked Man in The Good-Humoured Ladies by Léonide Massine; 1917.

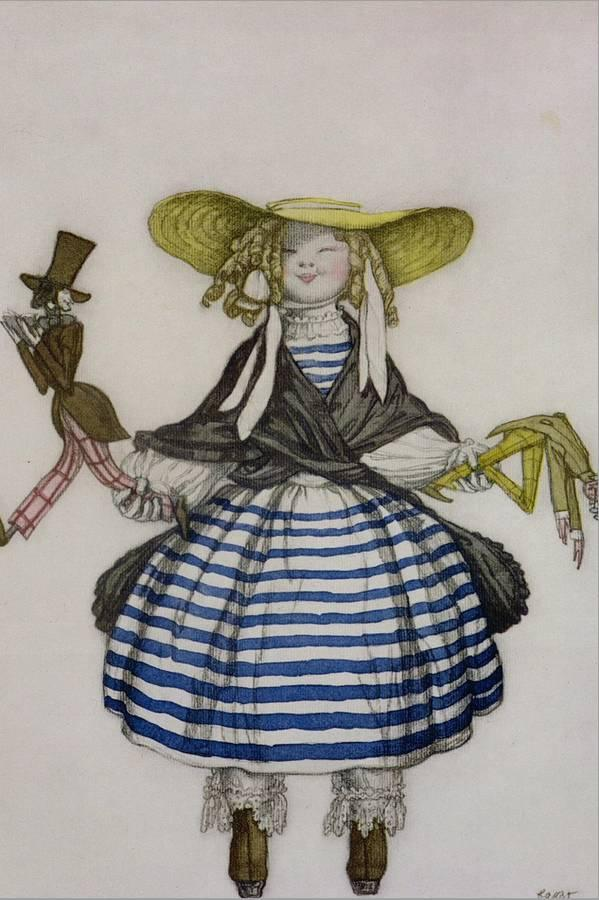
For the Puppet Girl in La Boutique fantasque by André Derain; 1919.

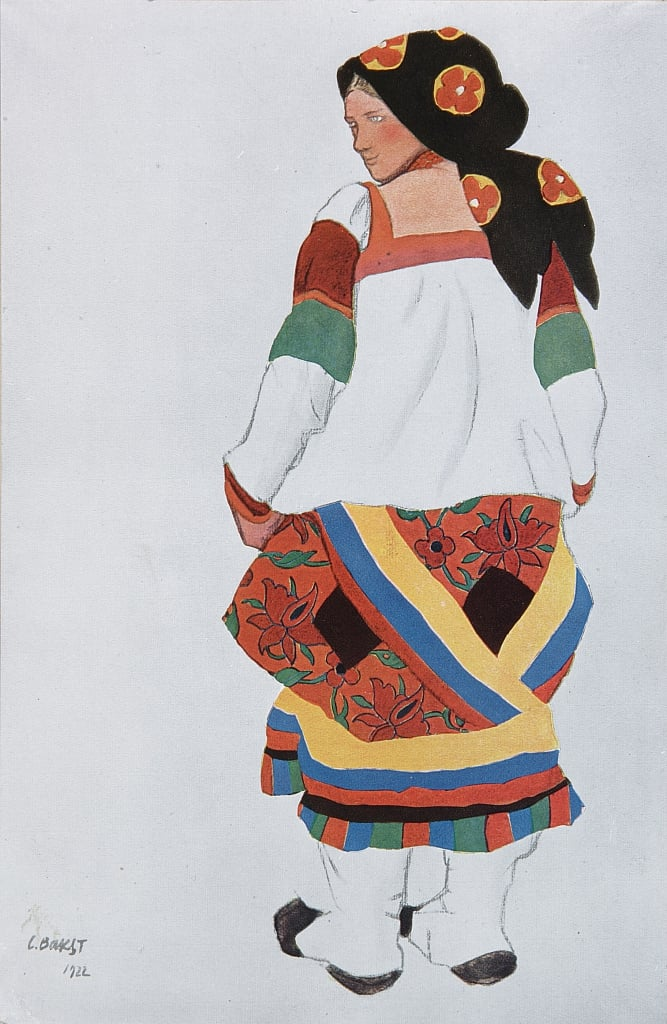
For the Russian Peasant Woman in Old Moscow; 1922.

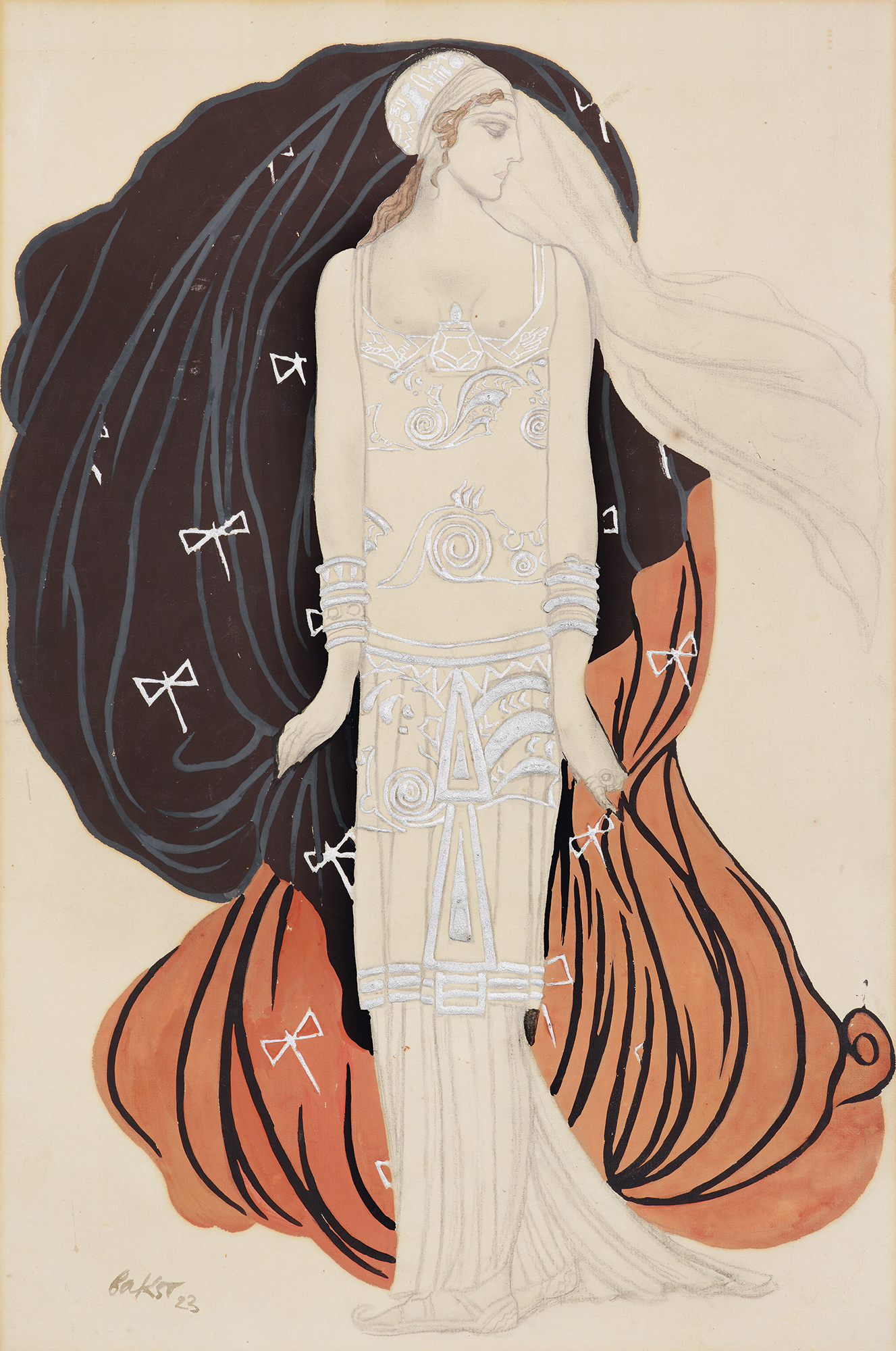
For Ida Rubinstein as Phaedra in Gabriele D'Annunzio's play; 1923, Museum of Avant-Garde Mastery.

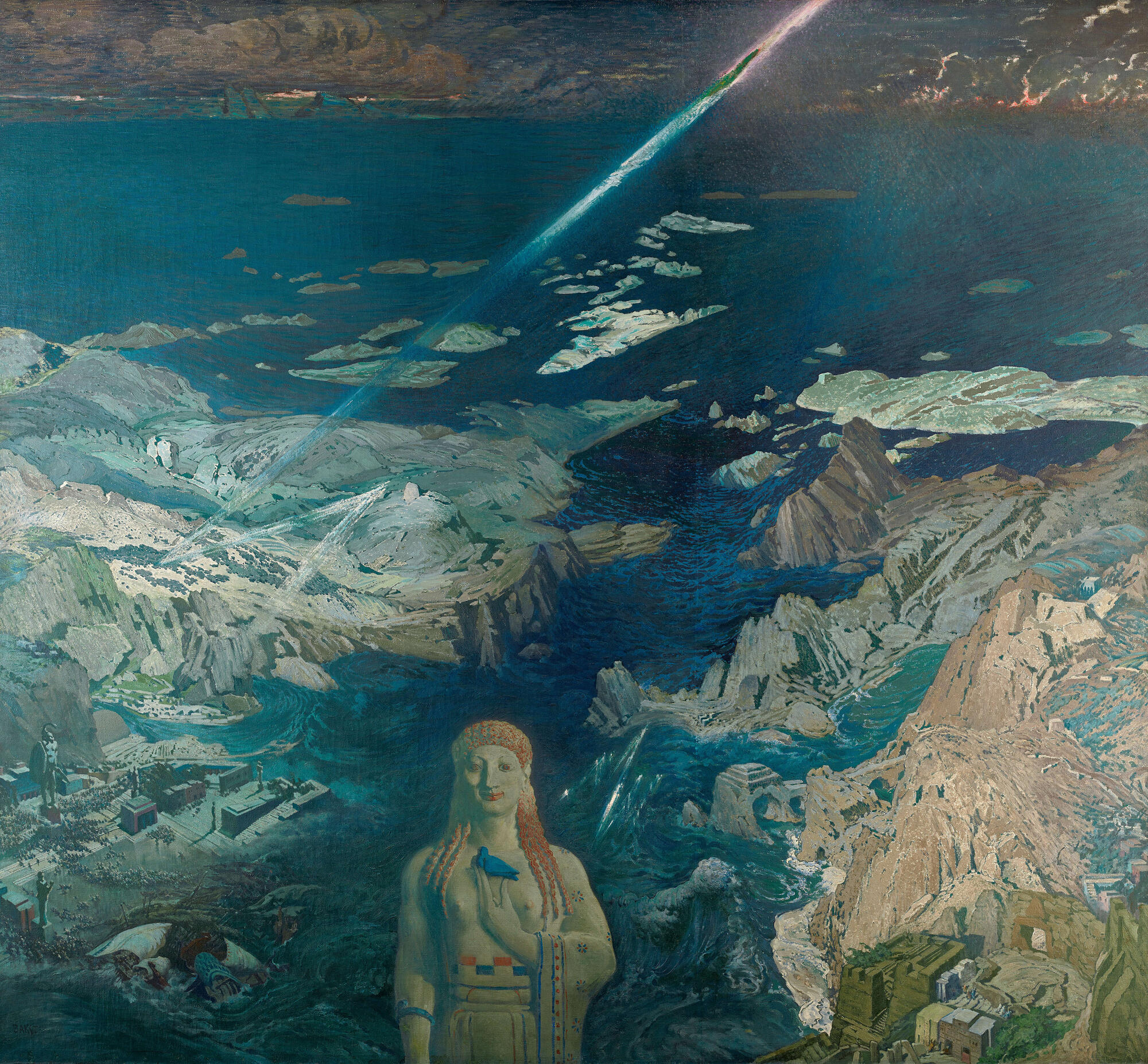
Terror Antiquus depicted destruction of Atlantis, Lion Gate of Mycenae, Tiryns and Acropolis of Athens, with Kore presiding over to symbolize chaos and inevitability of human force; 1908, oil on canvas, 250 × 270 cm, Russian Museum.

Despite being known for his work as a stage designer, art was also commissioned by various English families during the Art Deco era. During this time, he produced such works as the Sleeping Beauty series for James and Dorothy de Rothschild at Waddesdon Manor in 1913. The story is depicted in seven panels that line the walls of an oval, theatrical styled "Bakst room" in the Buckinghamshire manor house.

During his visits to Saint Petersburg, he taught in Zvantseva's school, where one of his students was Marc Chagall (1908–1910). Bakst described Chagall as a favorite, because when told to do something, he would listen carefully, but then he would take his paint and his brushes and do something completely different from the assignment.

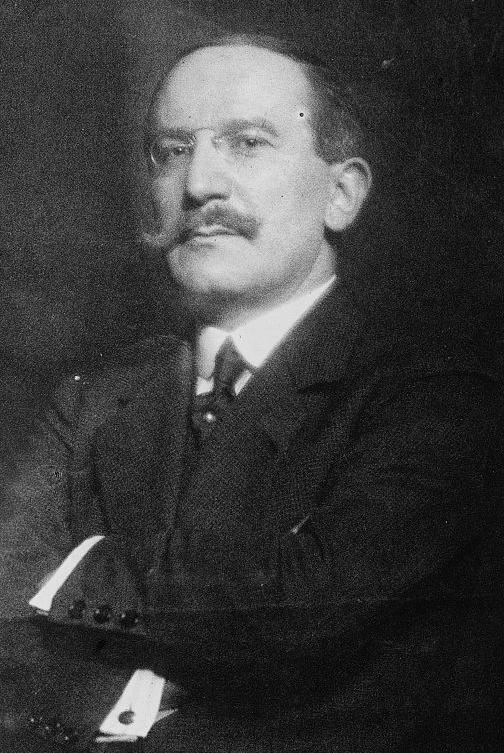
Bakst in 1916

In 1914, Bakst was elected a member of the Imperial Academy of Arts. Bakst's comprehensive, many-sided talent showed itself in various areas — he worked as a designer of clothes, set decorations, interiors, textile, etc. Apart from a series of interior designs for the Rothschilds, he also designed exhibitions for ‘Mir Iskusstva’ society and occupied a post of a furniture and interior designer at ‘Sovremennoe Iskusstvo’ (rus. ‘Modern Art’). American silk industry businessman Arthur Selig invited Bakst to create textile design, their collaboration had great success.

During this period his work was widely shown in the United States. Martin Birnbaum, manager of the Berlin Photographic Company in New York City, organized an exhibition of Bakst's work in 1913 in New York that then traveled to Detroit (1913), Buffalo (1914), Cincinnati (1914), Chicago (1914) and Montreal (1914). After the Revolution of 1917 Leon's sister died from hunger in Russia. When Bakst received the news, he suffered a nervous breakdown, becoming so ill that he couldn't tolerate any irritants such as light, noise, or touch. His servant, Linda, exploited his condition to steal his money — she took all the honoraria that came to the house and intimidated the artist, forcing him to include her and her husband as heirs to his will. By chance he managed to send a note to an influential friend and patron Alice Warder Garrett (1877–1952), an art philanthropist, who helped his sister Sofia rescue Léon. They first met in Paris in 1914, when Mrs. Garrett was accompanying her diplomat husband in Europe, Bakst soon depended upon Garrett as both a confidante and agent.

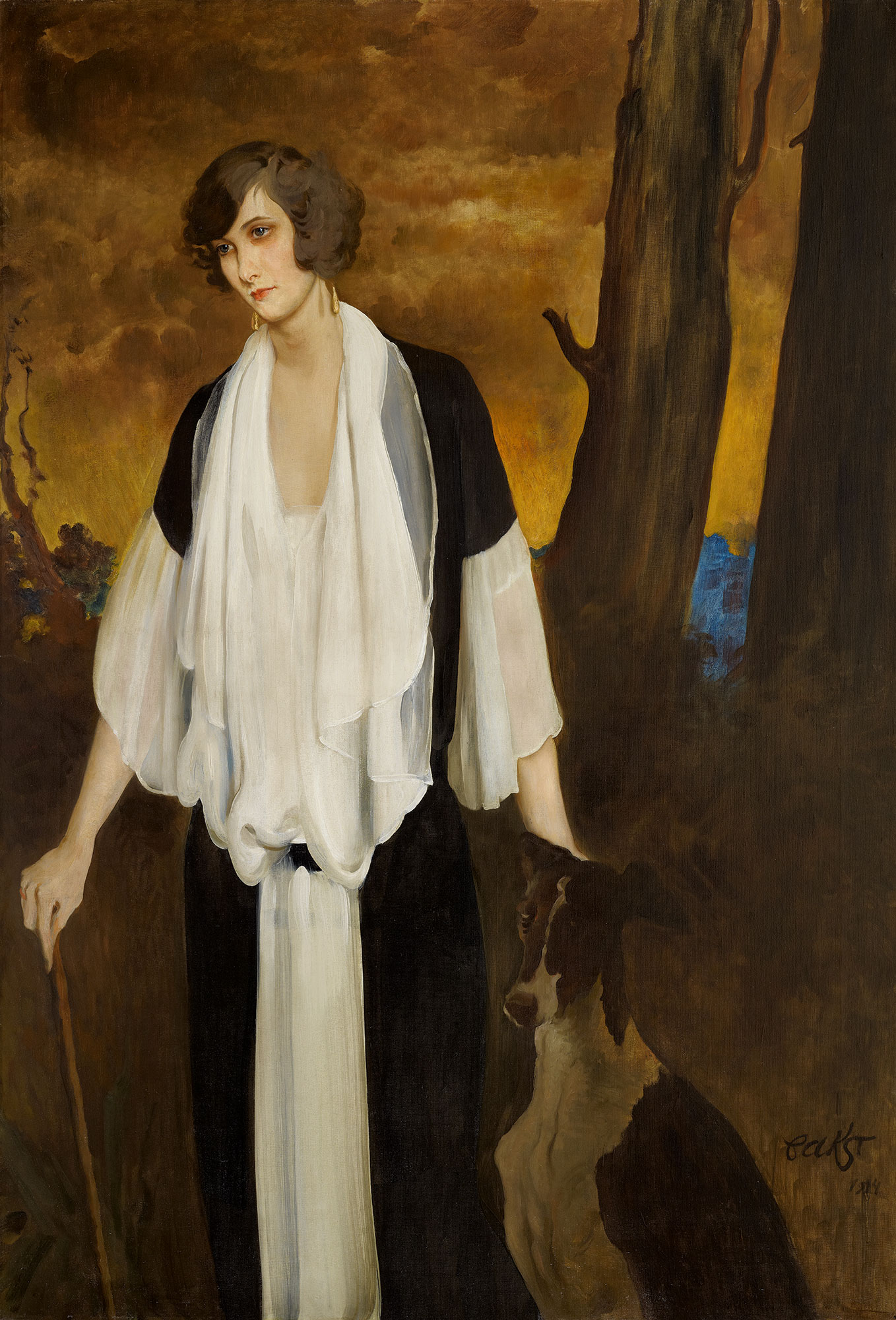
One of Bakst's last paintings: Portrait of Rachel Strong, future Countess Henri de Boisgelin; 1924, oil on canvas, 130×89 cm, Museum of Avant-Garde Mastery.

In 1922, Bakst broke off his relationship with Diaghilev and the Ballets Russes. During this year, he visited Baltimore and, specifically Evergreen House — the residence of his American friend Alice Garrett. Garrett became Bakst's representative in the United States upon her return home in 1920, organizing two exhibitions of the artist's work at New York's Knoedler Gallery, as well as subsequent traveling shows. When in Baltimore, Bakst re-designed the dining room of Evergreen into a shocking acidic yellow and 'Chinese' red confection. The artist transformed the house's small c. 1885 gymnasium into a colourfully Modernist private theatre. This is believed to be the only extant private theatre designed by Bakst.

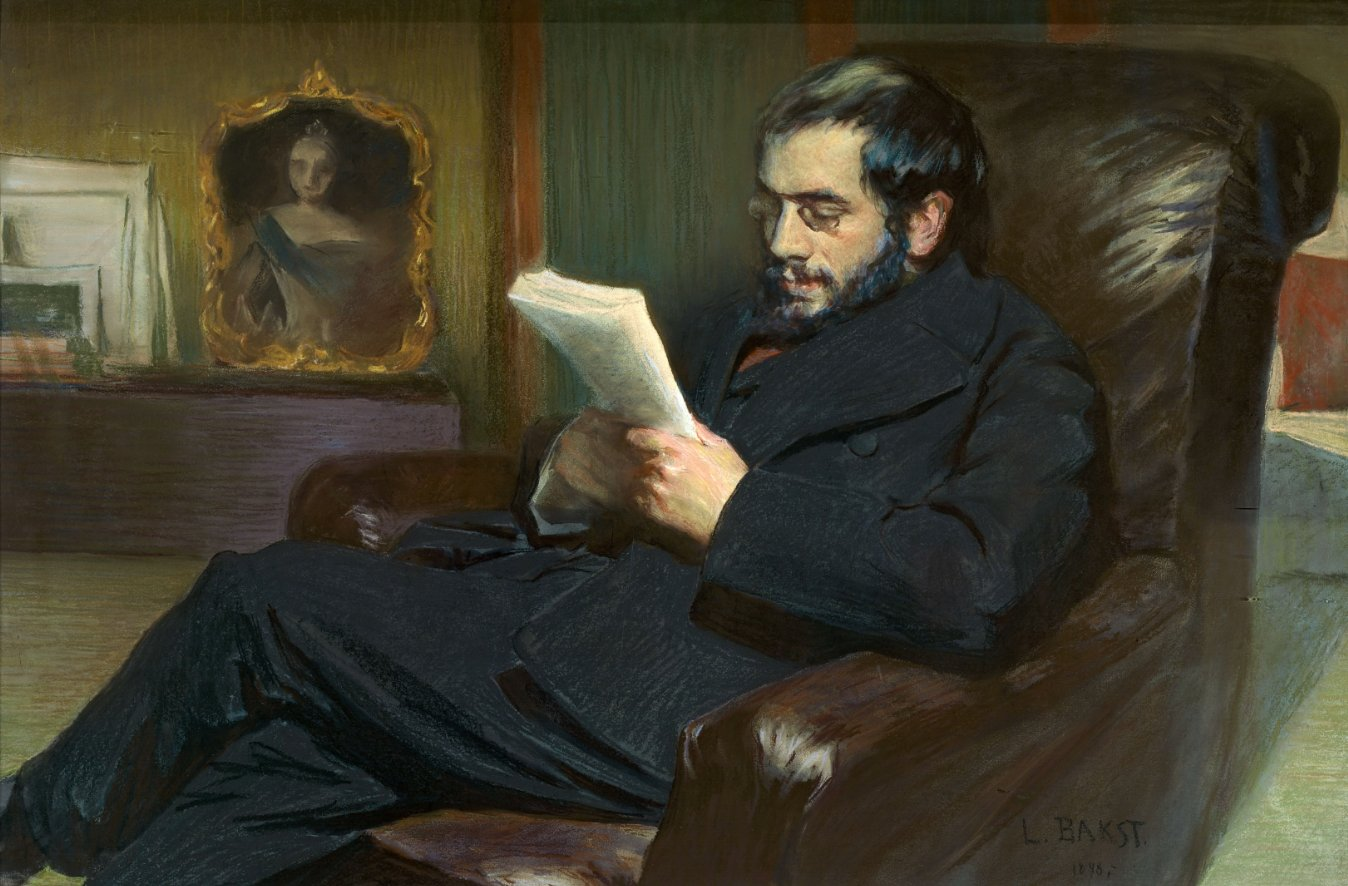
Alexandre Benois, 1898, watercolour and pastel on paper, 65 × 100 cm; Russian Museum

Léon Bakst was also a prolific writer, his literary legacy in three languages includes novels, numerous publications in magazines, critics, essays, letters to friends and colleagues.

Bakst died on 27 December 1924, in a clinic in Rueil Malmaison, near Paris, from lung problems (oedema). His many admirers amongst the most famous artists of the time, poets, musicians, dancers and critiques, formed a funeral procession to accompany his body to his final resting place, in the Cimetière des Batignolles, in Paris 17th Arrondissement, during a very moving ceremony.

In late 2010, the Victoria and Albert Museum in London presented an exhibit of Bakst's costumes and prints.

== Cultural depictions ==
- Anna Pavlova, film by Emil Loteanu; portrayed by Igor Dmitriev (1983).

== Selected works ==
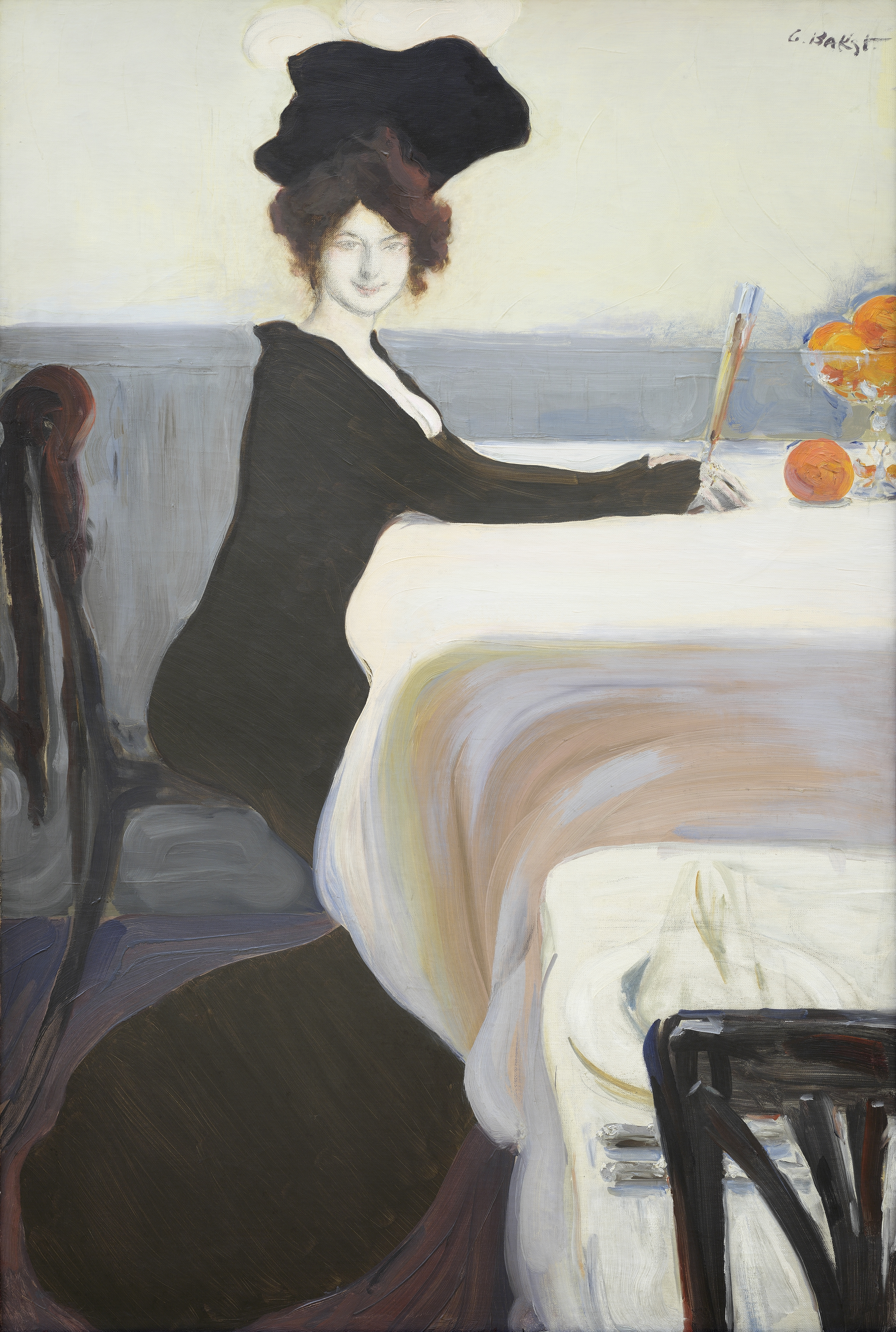
Dinner, 1902, oil on canvas, 150 × 100 cm; Russian Museum

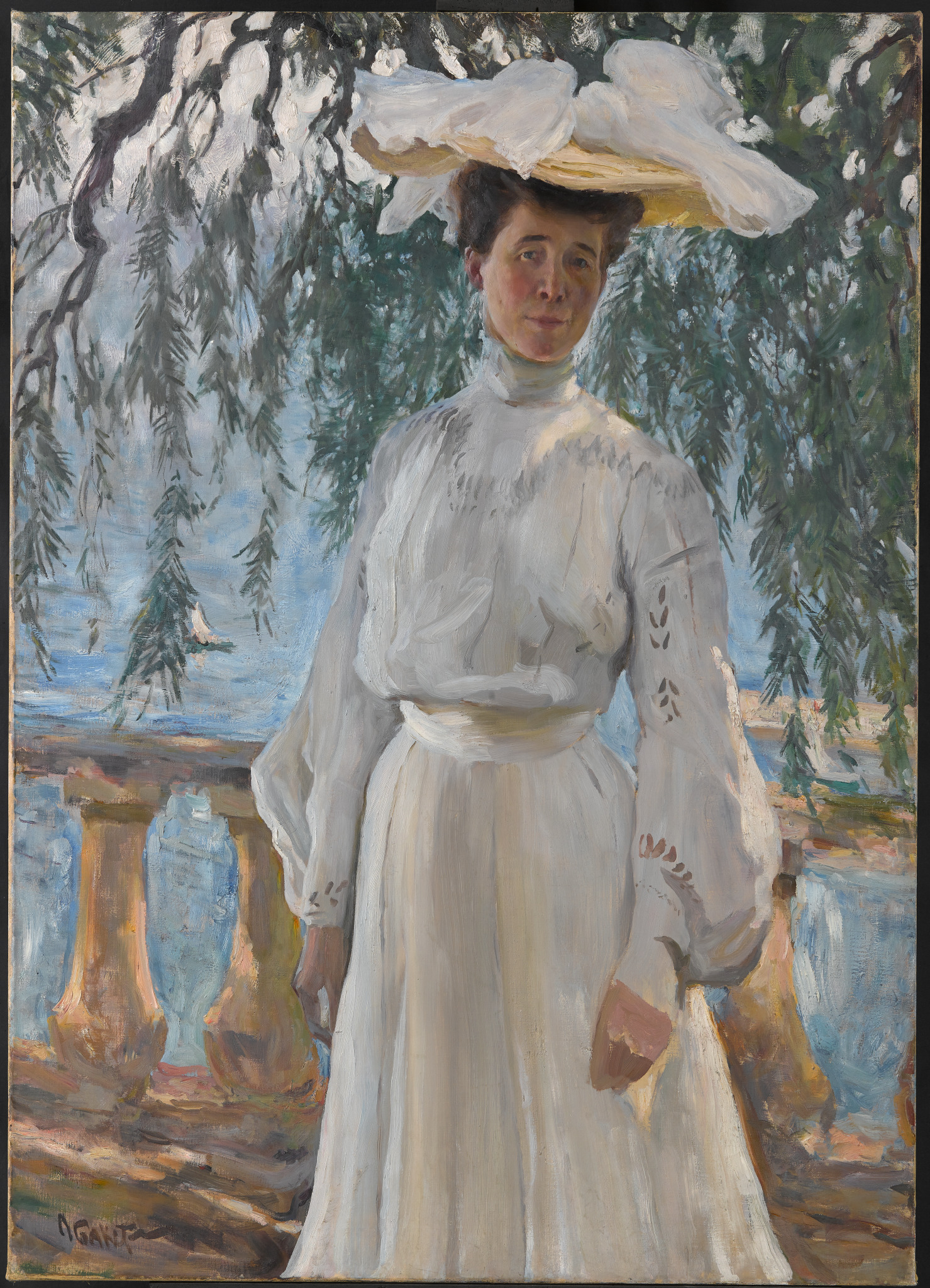
Lyubov Gritsenko-Bakst, the painter's spouse, 1903, oil on canvas, 140.3 × 100.4 cm; Tretyakov Gallery

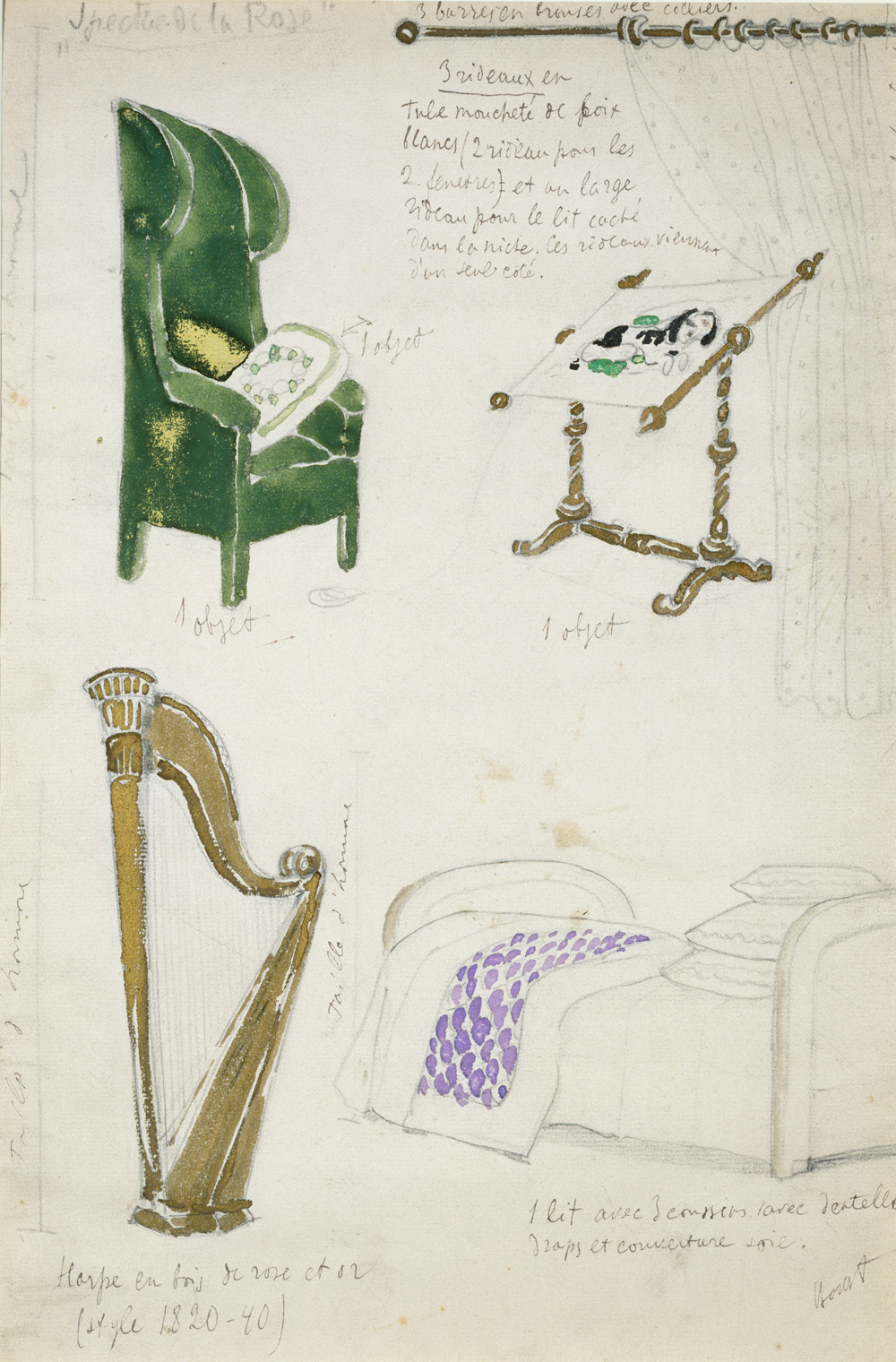
Stage furniture design for Le Spectre de la Rose by Michel Fokine; c. 1911.

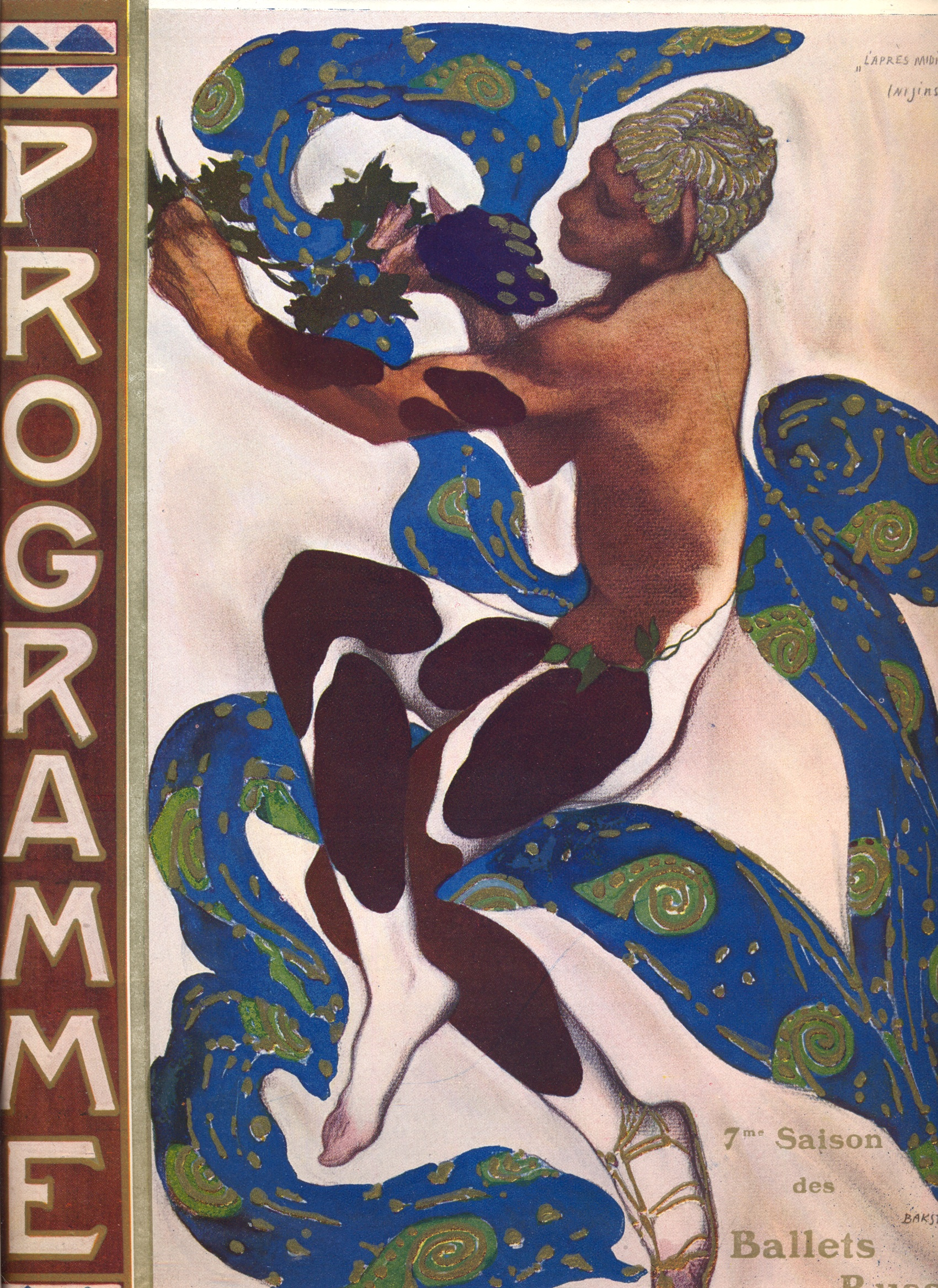
Poster for Afternoon of a Faun; 1912, private collection.

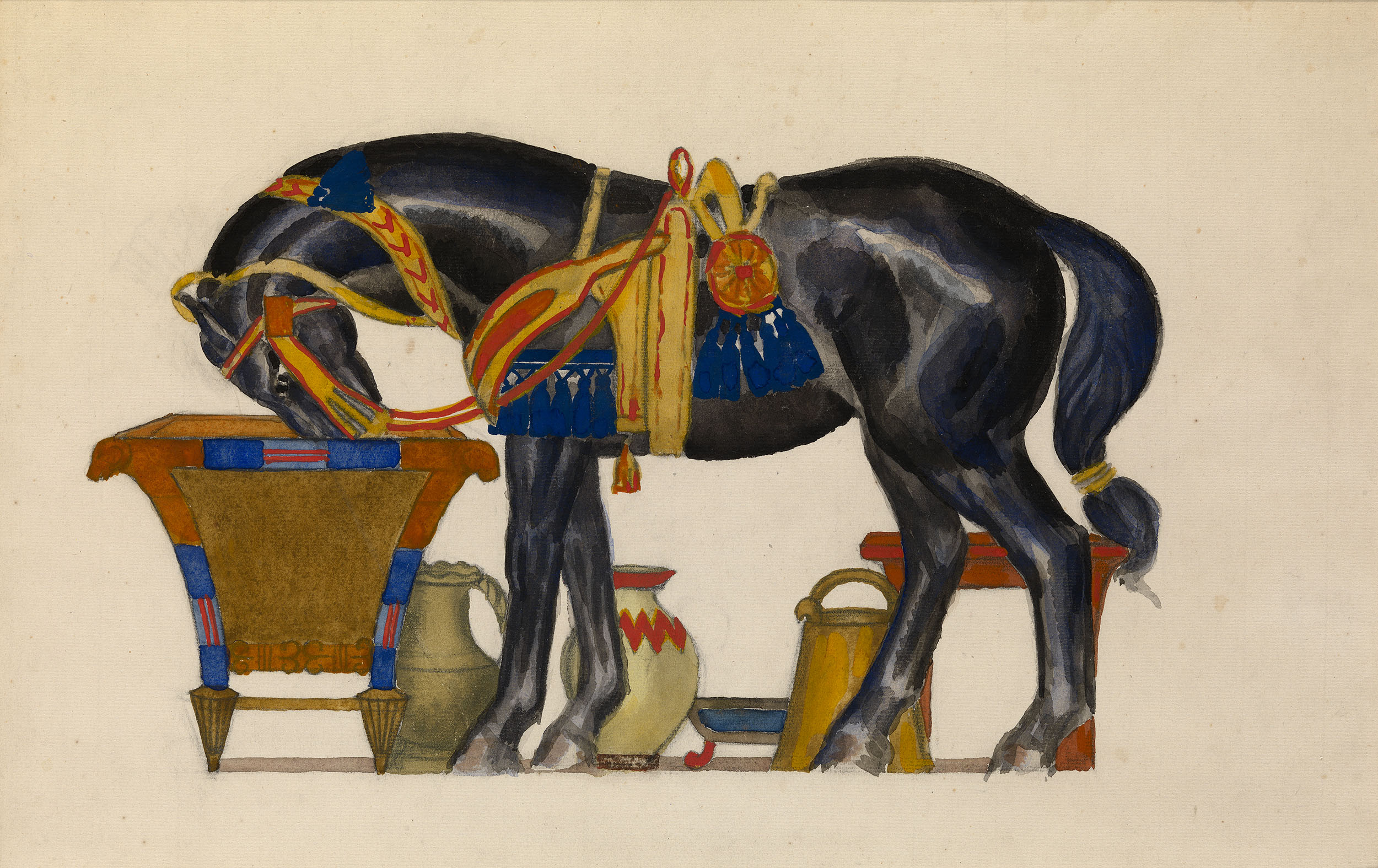
Drawing of a Horse Drinking; c. early 20th-century, pencil, watercolour and gouache on paper laid on cardboard, 33×49 cm, private collection.

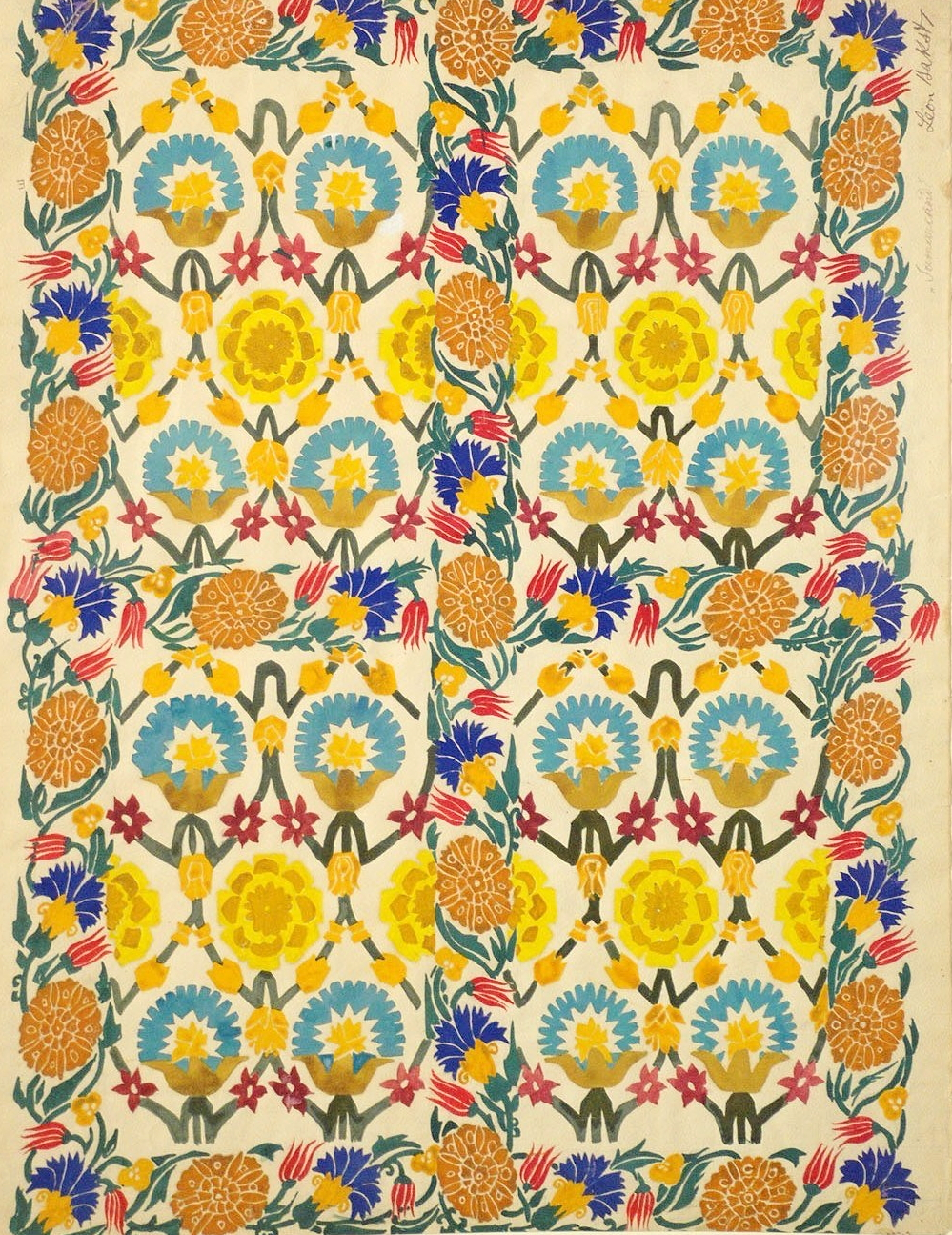
Textile Print; c. 1922.

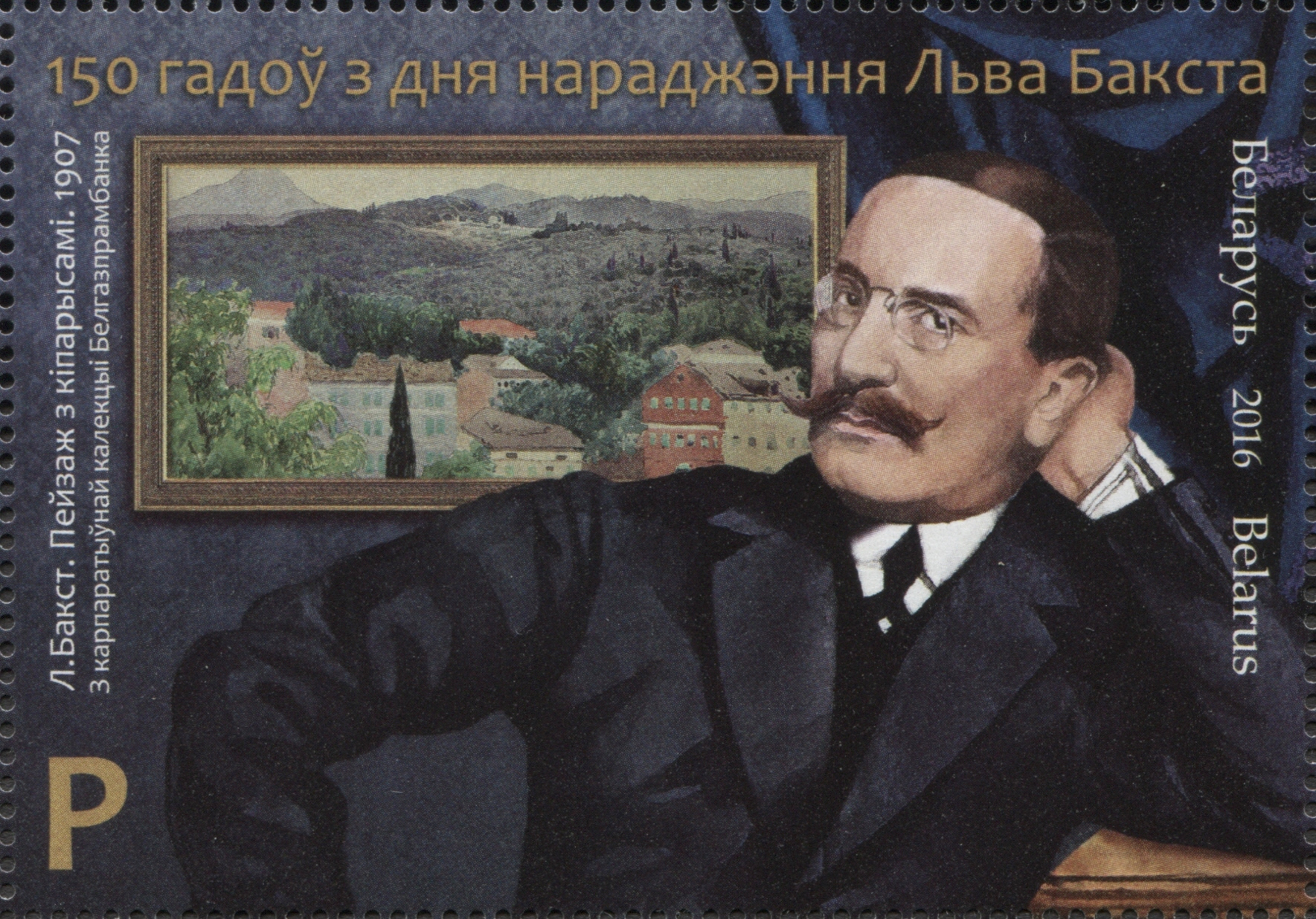
Stamp for the 150th Anniversary of Birth of Leon Bakst; 2016, Belposhta.
The Sleeping Beauty series; 1913–1922, oil on canvas, Waddesdon Manor

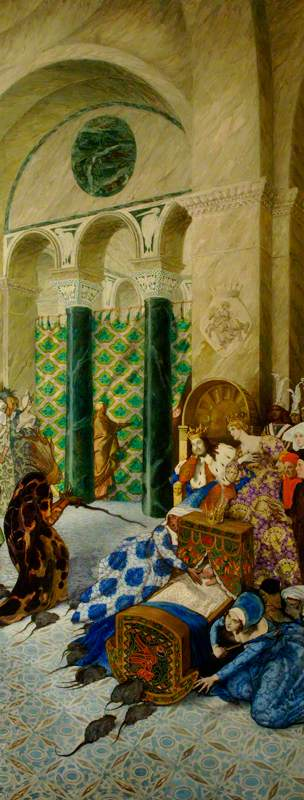
The Bad Fairy Visits the Christening; 212×84 cm

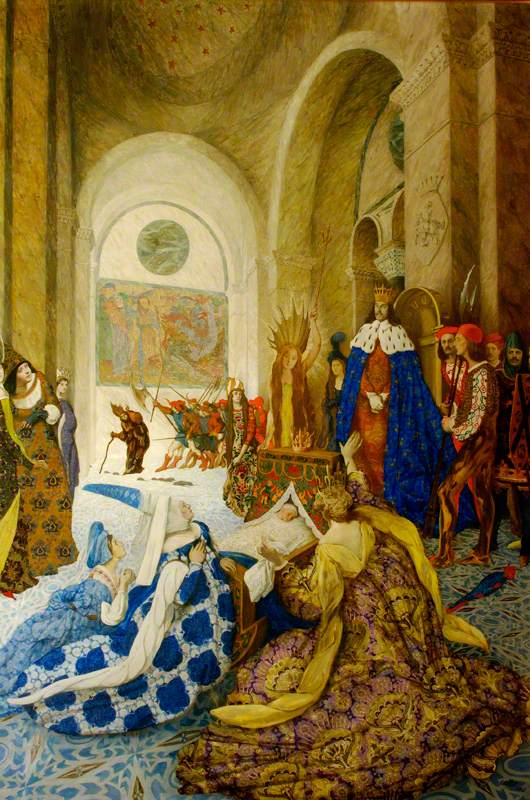
The Good Fairy's Promise; 210×140 cm

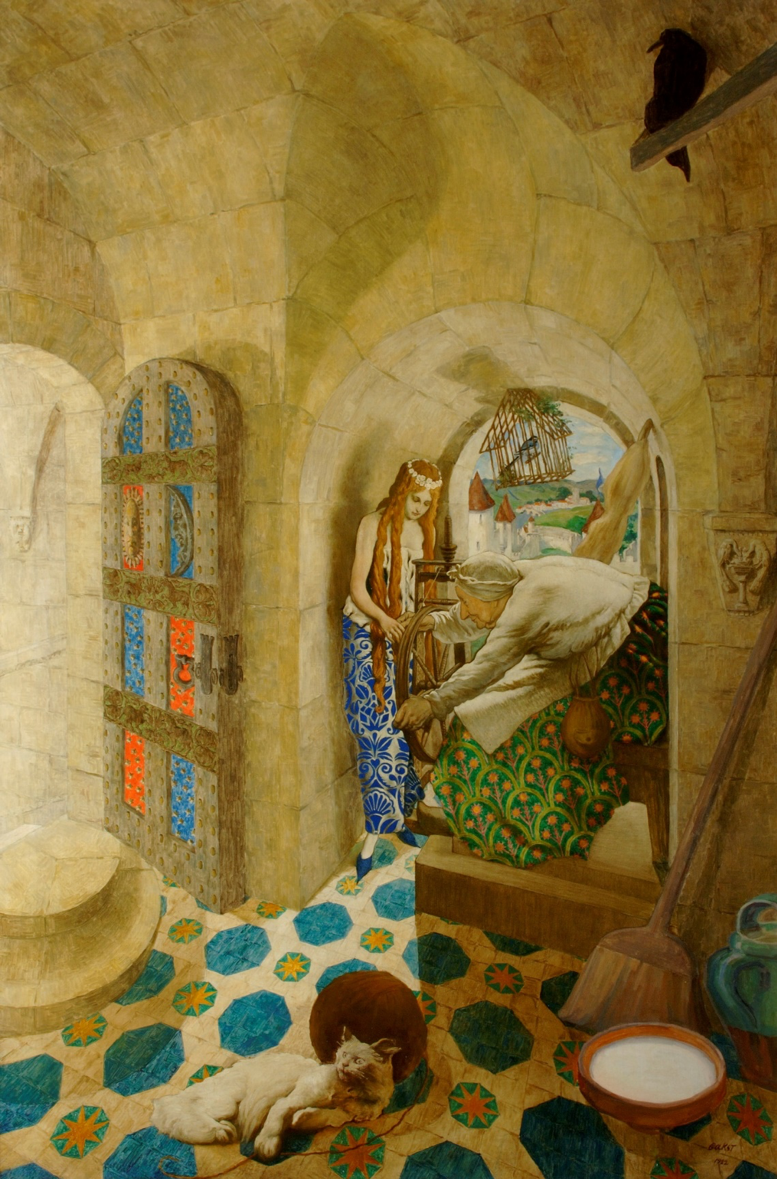
The Princess Pricks Her Finger on a Spinning Wheel; 213×143 cm

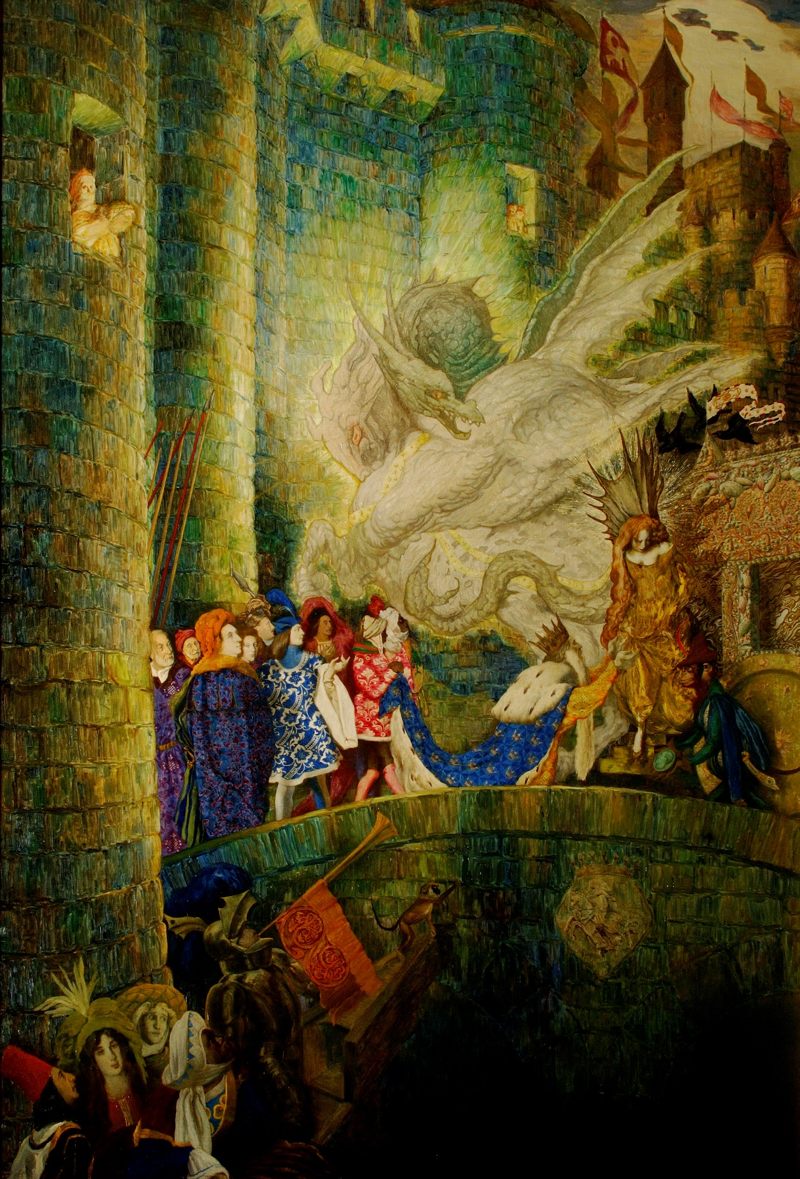
The Aged King Pleads with the Good Fairy; 212×143 cm

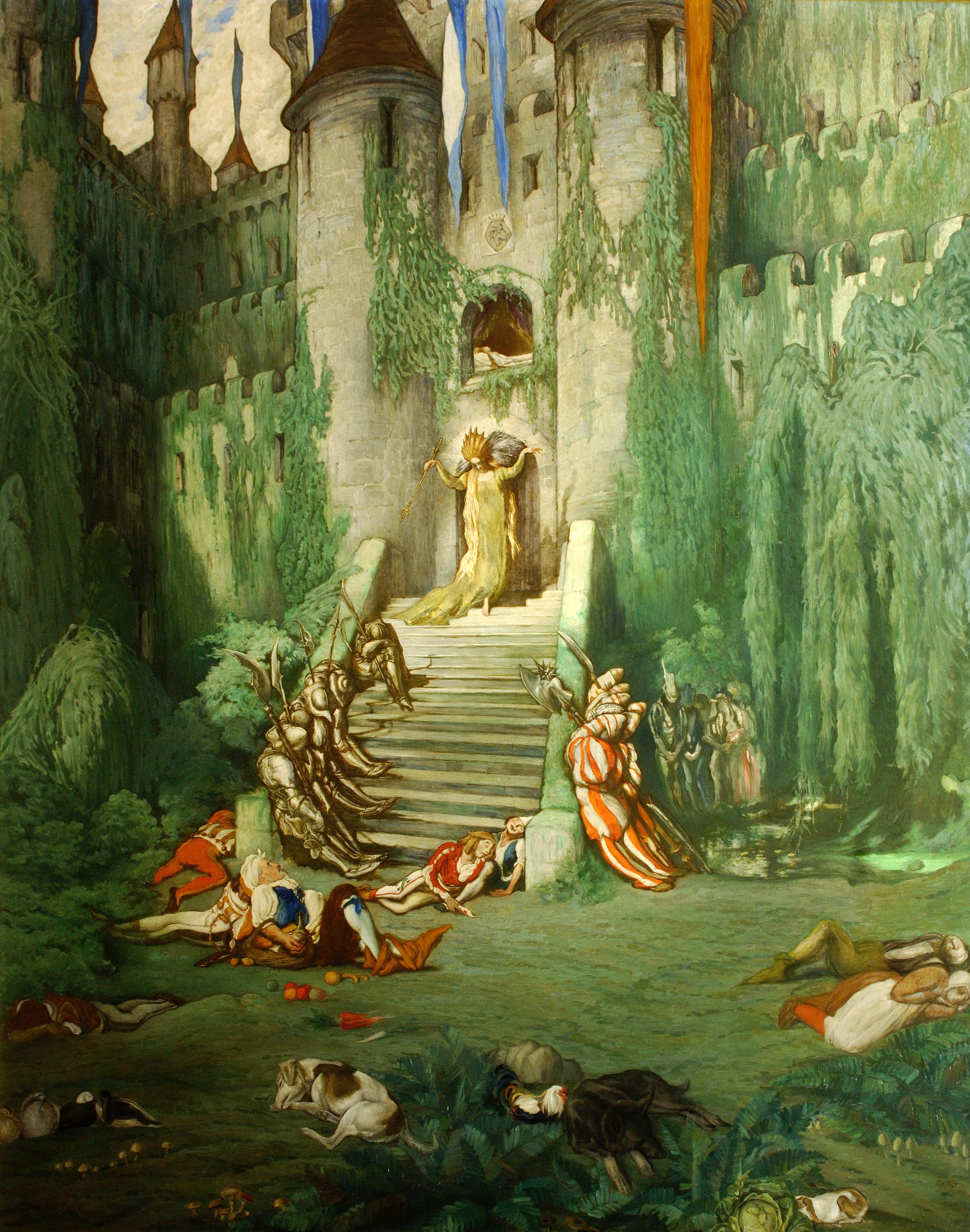
The Princess and the Court Fall Asleep for a Hundred Years; 212×171 cm

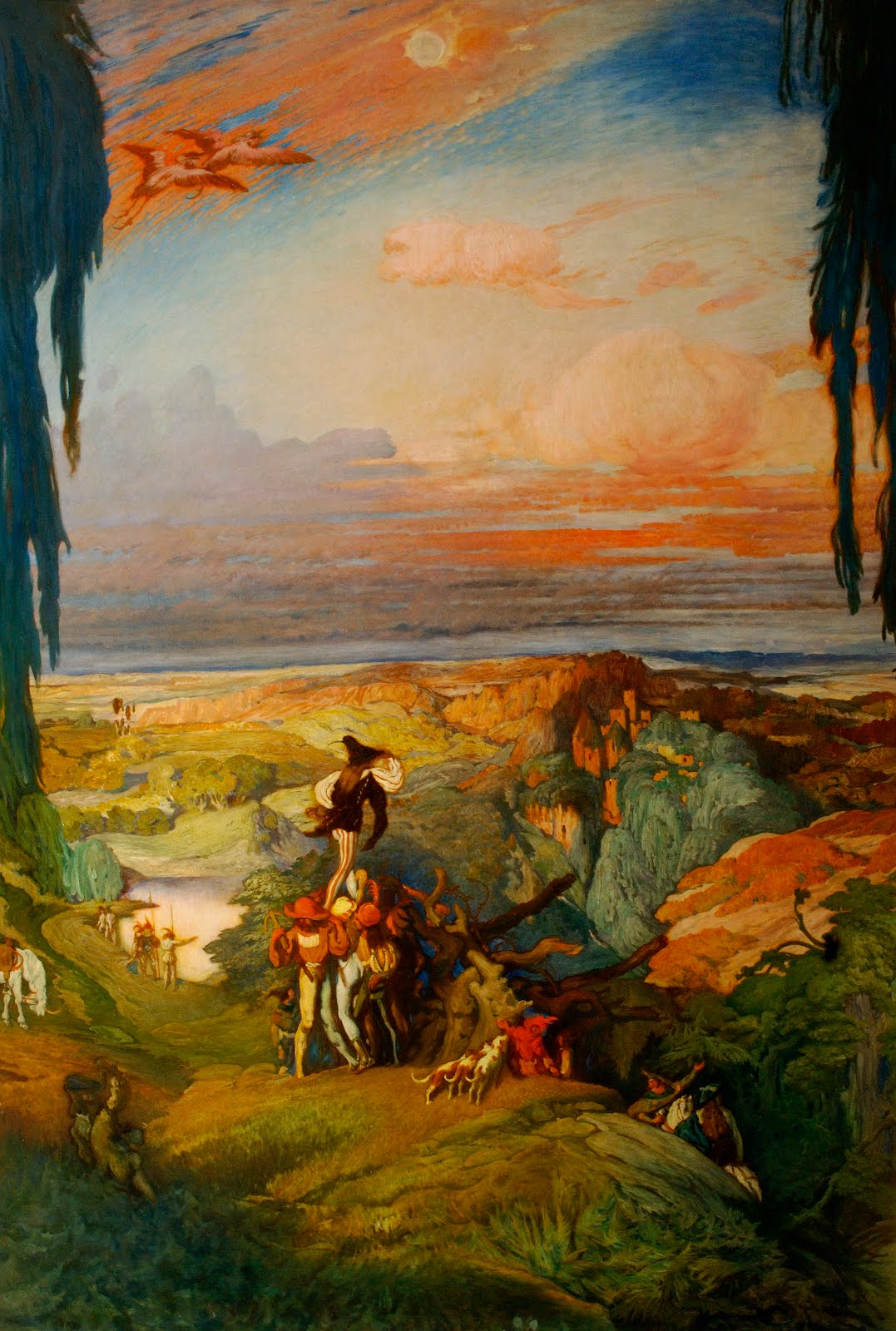
The Prince Out Hunting Sees the Castle Where the Princess Lies Sleeping; 212×142 cm

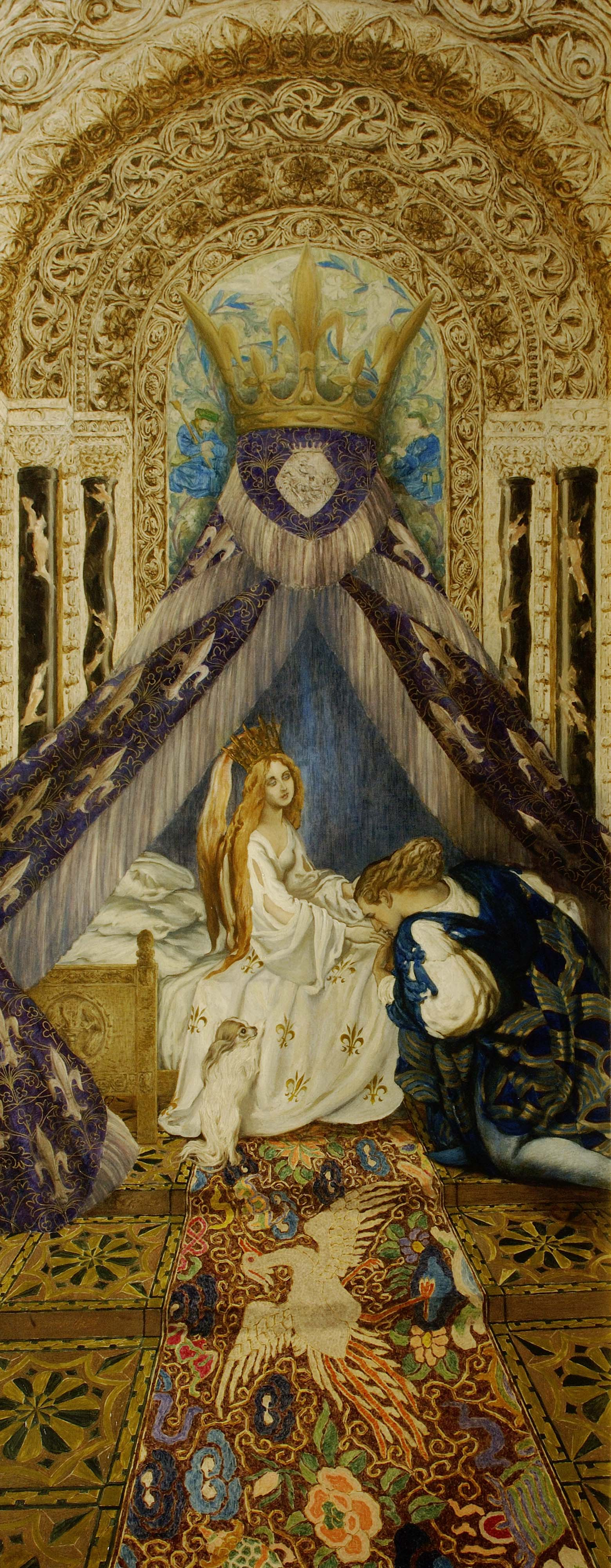
The Prince Discovers the Princess and Wakes Her with a Kiss; 212×84 cm

== See also ==
- List of Orientalist artists
- Orientalism
- Place des États-Unis

== General sources ==
- Marc Chagall, My Life, St.-Petersburg, Azbuka, 2000, ISBN 5-267-00200-3
- Codell, Julie," Convergences: Art History, Museums and Scholar-Agent Martin Birnbaum's Transatlantic Art for the Public," Art Markets, Agents and Collectors, eds. A. Turpin and S. Bracken. Bloomsbury, 2021, 316–327
- Léon Bakst, Serov et moi en Grèce, translation and introduction by Olga Medvedkova, preface by Véronique Schiltz, TriArtis Editions, 2015, 128 p., 24 illustrations (ISBN 978-2-916724-56-0; OCLC 902790439
- Olga Medvedkova, Лев Бакст, портрет художника в образе еврея. Опыт интеллектуальной биографии, НЛО, "Очерки визуальности", 2019 ISBN 978-54448-1154-2
- Olga Medvedkova. « … Dont l’esprit est devenu en vérité antique » : Léon Bakst et les lectures nietzschéennes en Russie. Ioulia Podoroga (dir.). Concepts migrateurs. Les lettres et les arts russes, espaces de circulations et de métamorphoses (XVIIIe - XXe siècles), Eur'Orbem Éditions, pp.221-242, 2024, Cultures & sociétés, ISBN 979-10-989-394.
- Olga Medvedkova. Léon Bakst ou l’art de la vignette. Sophie Lesiewicz, Hélène Vedrine. Eloge du parergon : l'art décoratif du livre fin-de-siècle, Éditions Otrante, 2021.
- Olga Medvedkova, "Bakst penseur et écrivain: en russe et en français", Cahiers du Monde russe , n° 58, 20.
- Usova, M. N. (2016). ""Трехфамилие" Бакста: Рабинович, Розенберг, Бакст. От Лейбы Рабиновича до Леона Бакста" [Three Surnames of Leon Bakst: Rabinovich, Rosenberg, Bakst. From Leyb Rabinovich to Leon Bakst]. Journal of the Vaganova State Ballet Academy (in Russian). 5 (46): 72–82.
- Bowlt, J. E.; Chernukhina, A.; Kovaleva, O.; Terkel, E. (2008). ""Words of Magic": The Literary heritage of Leon Bakst" (PDF). The Tretyakov Gallery (1): 80–82.
- André Levinsohn: Ballets Russes. Die Kunst des Léon Bakst (Die bibliophilen Taschenbücher. 666). Harenberg-Edition, Dortmund 1992, ISBN 978-3-88379-666-6.
- Horst Schumacher: Bakst, Leon. In: Manfred Brauneck, Wolfgang Beck (Hrsg.): Theaterlexikon 2. Schauspieler und Regisseure, Bühnenleiter, Dramaturgen und Bühnenbildner. Rowohlts Enzyklopädie im Rowohlt Taschenbuch Verlag. Reinbek bei Hamburg, August 2007, ISBN 978-3-499-55650-0, S. 33.
