= The Good-Humoured Ladies =

Ballet produced in 1917 by Sergei Diaghilev's Ballets Russes

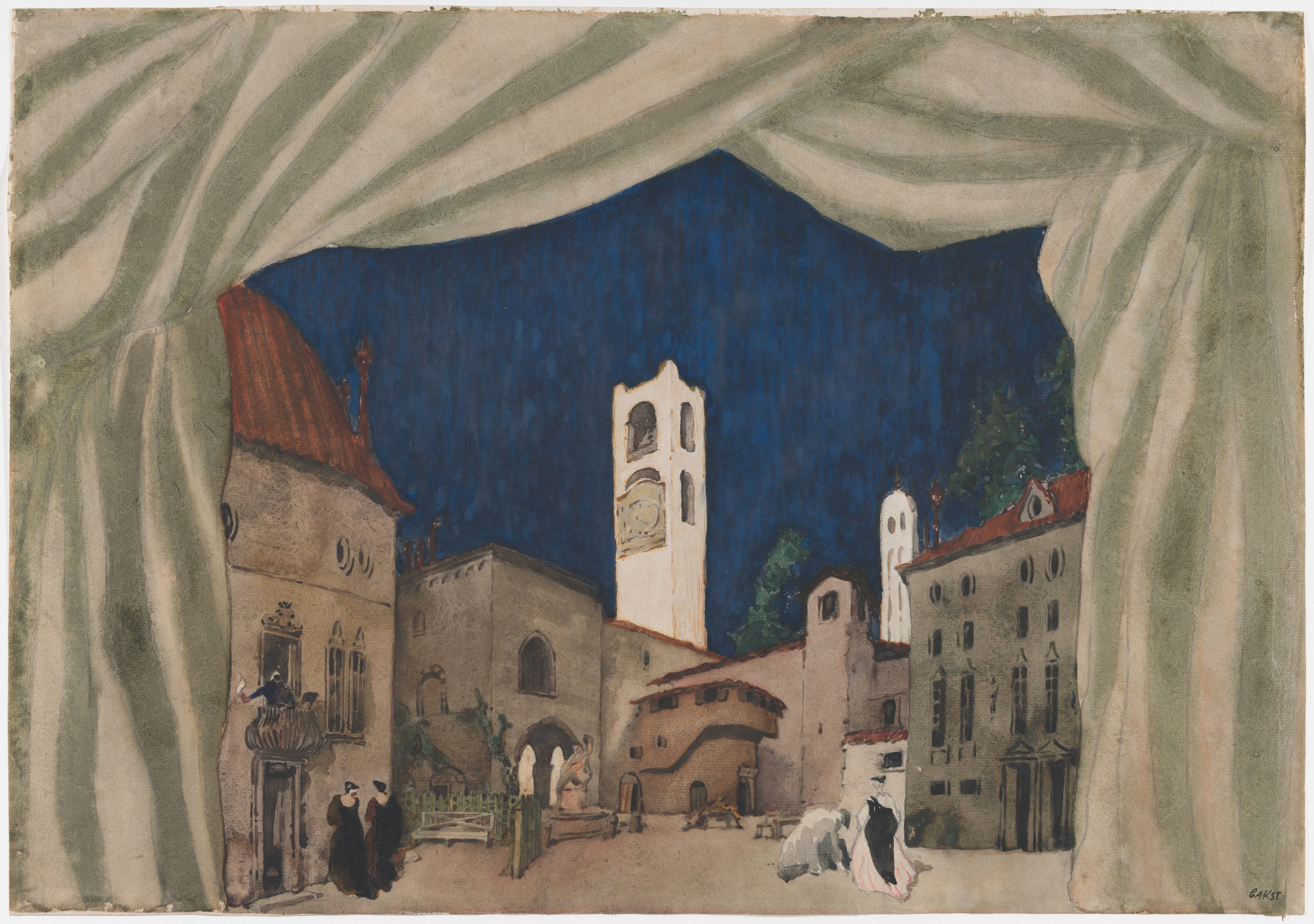
Design for a stage set for the Ballet 'Le donne de buon umore’ (The Good-Humoured Ladies) by Léon Bakst.

The Good-Humoured Ladies (Le donne de buon umore) is a ballet with scenery and costumes by Léon Bakst, choreography by Léonide Massine, and music arranged from sonatas of Domenico Scarlatti by Vincenzo Tommasini. Written in 1917, the piece was based on a comedy by Carlo Goldoni; its plot concerns the diversions of a count disguised as a woman, at a carnival. It was produced in Rome in April 1917 by Sergei Diaghilev's Ballets Russes.

The ballet was later arranged into a suite for orchestra, in six movements:

1. Overture (Allegro)
2. Presto
3. Allegro
4. Andante
5. Tempo di ballo (Non presto)
6. Cat's Fugue and Finale (Presto)

The Scarlatti sonatas adapted for the ballet are:

- G major, K. 2, L. 388, P. 58
- D major, K. 435, L. 361, P. 466
- B minor, K. 87, L. 33, P. 43
- G major, K. 455, L. 209, P. 354
- G minor, K. 30, L. 499, P. 86 (Cat's Fugue)
- D major, K. 430, L. 463, P. 463
- F major, K. 445, L. 385, P. 468.
