= Paesaggi toscani =

Paesaggi toscani (Tuscan Landscapes) is a rhapsody for orchestra composed in 1922 by Vincenzo Tommasini; it was introduced in Rome in December, 1923. The piece is based on Tuscan folk melodies, and is played in two uninterrupted sections. The first, marked Andante sostenuto, presents a melancholy melody against a somewhat nebulous harmonic backdrop; the second movement, marked Vivace, changes the mood of the piece with two lively tunes.
