= Vincenzo Tommasini =

Italian composer (1878–1950)

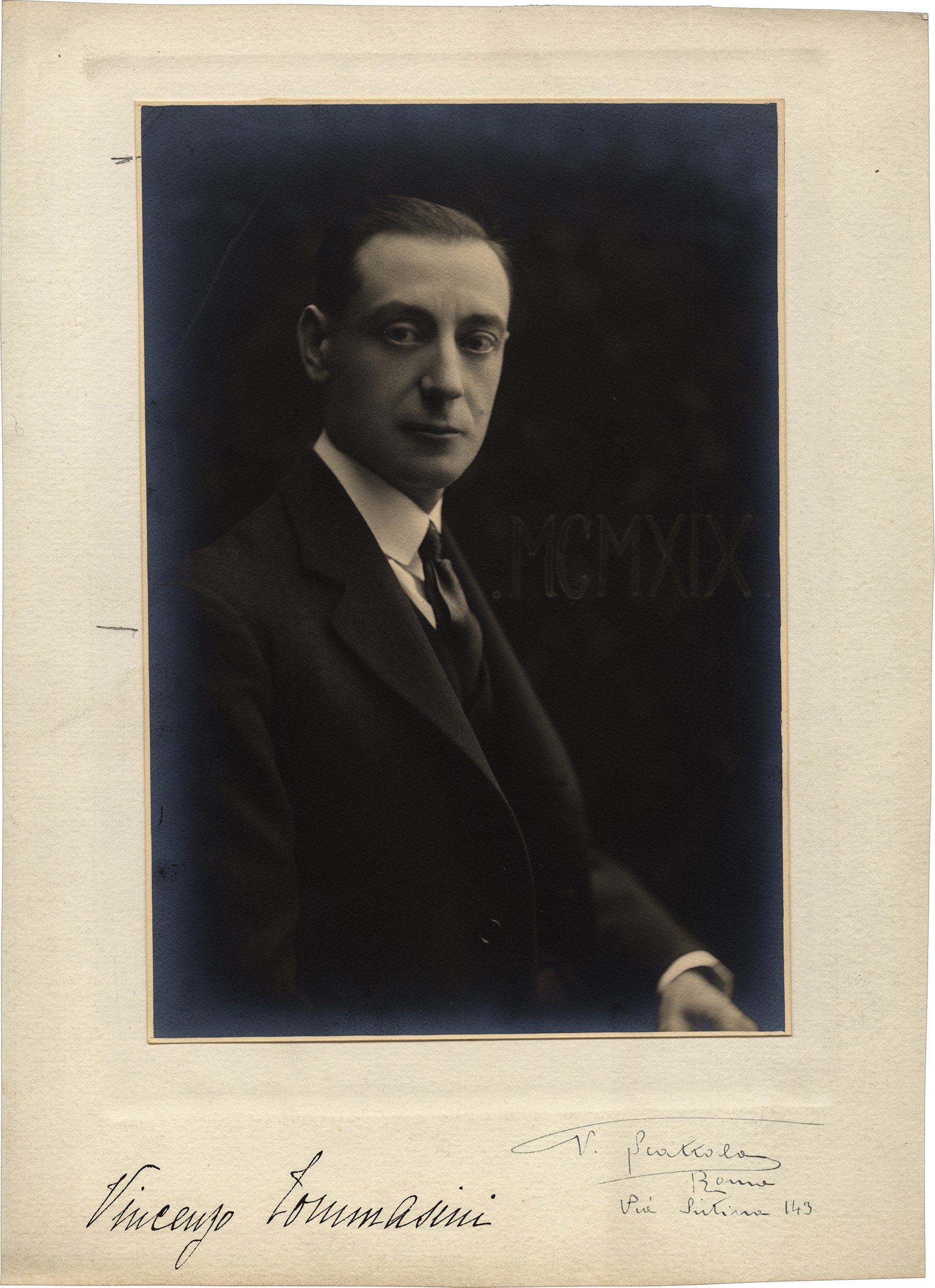
Vincenzo Tommasini

Vincenzo Tommasini (17 September 1878 – 23 December 1950) was an Italian composer.

== Biography ==
Born in Rome, Tommasini studied philology and the Greek language at the University of Rome, at the same time pursuing equally intensive studies in music at the Academy of St. Cecilia. In 1902 he traveled extensively throughout Europe; during this time he studied under Max Bruch in Berlin. He first achieved note with a one-act opera, Uguale fortuna, which won a national competition. His biggest success internationally was his 1916 arrangement of keyboard sonatas by Domenico Scarlatti for the Sergei Diaghilev ballet in The Good-Humoured Ladies (Le donne di buon umore). It was he and Arturo Toscanini who completed Arrigo Boito's unfinished opera Nerone.

Tommasini was a leading figure in the revival of orchestral music in twentieth-century Italy. Among his other works are Paesaggi toscani (Tuscan Landscapes) for orchestra and a set of variations, also for orchestra, on the Carnival of Venice.

He died in Rome.

== Selected filmography ==
- A Pistol Shot (1942)
