= Bronislava Nijinska =

Russian ballet dancer, teacher and choreographer (1891–1972)

Bronislawa Nijinska
- Бронислава Нижинская
- Born: Bronisława Niżyńska; January 8, 1891; Minsk, Russian Empire
- Died: February 21, 1972 (aged 81); Pacific Palisades, Los Angeles, U.S.
- Occupations: Ballet dancer; choreographer; ballet teacher
- Spouses: Alexandre Kochetovsky; Nicholas Singaevsky
- Children: 2, including Irina
- Relatives: Vaslav Nijinsky (brother); Kyra Nijinsky (niece)
- Awards: National Museum of Dance's Mr. & Mrs. Cornelius Vanderbilt Whitney Hall of Fame, 1994

Bronislava Nijinska (/ˌbrɒnɪˈslɑːvə nɪˈ(d)ʒɪnskə/; Polish: Bronisława Niżyńska [brɔɲiˈswava ɲiˈʐɨj̃ska]; Russian: Бронисла́ва Фоми́нична Нижи́нская, romanized: Bronisláva Fomínična Nižínskaja; Belarusian: Браніслава Ніжынская, romanized: Branislava Nižynskaja; January 8, 1891 [O.S. December 27, 1890] – February 21, 1972) was a Russian ballet dancer of Polish origin, and an innovative choreographer. She came of age in a family of traveling, professional dancers.

Her own career began in Saint Petersburg. She soon joined Ballets Russes which ventured to Paris and triumph. She then met war-time difficulties in Petrograd and revolutionary turbulence in Kiev. Back in France with Ballets Russes, public acclaim for her works came quickly, cresting in the 1920s. She later enjoyed continuing successes in Europe and the Americas. Nijinska played a pioneering role in the broad movement that diverged from 19th-century classical ballet. Her introduction of modern forms, steps, and motion, and a minimalist narrative, prepared the way of future works.

Following serious home training, at the age of nine she entered the state ballet school in the Russian capital. In 1908 she graduated as an 'Artist of the Imperial Theatres'. An early breakthrough came in Paris in 1910 when she became a member of Diaghilev's ballet company, Ballets Russes. Nijinska for her dance solo created the role of Papillon in Carnaval, a ballet written and designed by Michel Fokine.

She assisted her famous brother Vaslav Nijinsky as he worked up his controversial choreography for L'Après-midi d'un faune, which Ballets Russes premiered in Paris in 1912. Similarly, she aided him in his creation of the 1913 ballet The Rite of Spring.

Surviving in Petrograd and Kiev during the First World War, the Revolution and Civil War, she worked in dance and struggled to independently develop her own artistic vision. Performing in dance halls, then in theaters, Nijinska soon designed and staged her first choreographies. She started a ballet school on progressive lines also in Kiev. Her writings on the art of movement were published. In 1921 she fled Soviet authorities who had closed her school.

Rejoining Ballets Russes which had continued in France, Diaghilev appointed Nijinska the choreographer of his company. She thrived, creating several popular, cutting-edge ballets to contemporary music. In 1923, with a score by Igor Stravinsky she choreographed her iconic work Les noces [The Wedding].

Starting in 1925, with a variety of companies and venues she designed and mounted ballets in Europe and the Americas. Among them were Teatro Colón, Ida Rubinstein, Vienna Staatsoper, Opéra Russe à Paris, Wassily de Basil, Max Reinhardt, Markova-Dolin, Ballet Polonaise, Ballet Theatre, the Hollywood Bowl, Jacob's Pillow, Serge Denham, Marquis de Cuevas, as well as her own companies.

Due to war in 1939 she relocated from Paris to Los Angeles. Nijinska continued working in choreography and as an artistic director. She also taught at her studio. In the 1960s for The Royal Ballet in London, she staged revivals of her Ballets Russes-era creations. Her Early Memoirs, translated into English, was published posthumously.

== Early life ==
=== A family of dancers ===
Bronislava Nijinska was the third child of the Polish dancers Tomasz [Foma] Niżyński and Eleonora née Bereda, who were then traveling performers in provincial Russia. The father came from a landed gentry family. The mother came from a Warsaw family of carpenters. Bronislava was born in Minsk. All three children were baptized in the Holy Cross Church in Warsaw, she on 30 April 1891. Nijinska was the younger sister of Vaslav Nijinsky (Wacław Niżyński), a dancer of world renown.

Each of their parents had begun dancing careers in Warsaw at the Grand Theatre (Teatr Wielki). When they later met, each was already a ballet professional with the Setov troupe based in Kiev. With the troupe they performed in provincial capitals of the then Russian Empire. They were married in Baku. Tomasz Niżyński, five years younger, had risen to be premier danseur and ballet master. His wife Eleonora Bareda, orphaned at seven, had followed her elder sister into ballet, and was then dancing as a first soloist.

By his skills as a ballet master, the father Tomasz Niżyński managed to form and direct his own small troupe of a dozen dancers, plus students. He created a ballet pantomime, and performed in 'circus-theaters', using Polish and Russian music. In 1896 he staged The Fountain of Bakhchisarai, from an 1823 poem by Pushkin. The mother Eleonora danced the role of the captured princess; her children Vatsa and Broni watched her performances on stage. Tomasz choreographed "two very successful ballets", the other being Zaporozbeskaya Tcharovnitza. Nijinska implies that their small troupe prospered, but that has been questioned. In addition to renting theaters for his shows, Tomasz contracted with 'café chantants', popular nightspots where patrons dined while being entertained with music and dance. Family life was surrounded by artists at work and at home. Her father "loved to be with painters, writers, actors, and musicians." Two touring African-American tap dancers, Jackson and Johnson, visited their home, and gave Nijinska her first lessons.

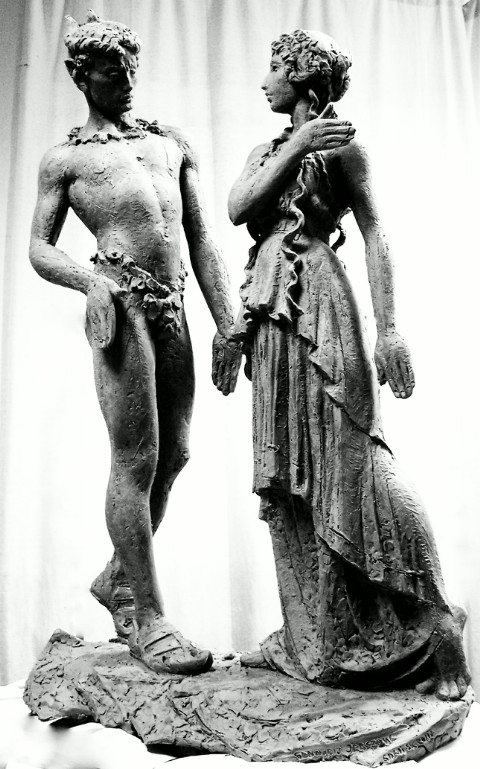
Her brother Vaslav Nijinsky and Bronislava Nijinska, sculpture by Giennadij Jerszow, the Grand Theatre, Warsaw

In the past Tomasz had forgone opportunities, turning down dance offers because of his family obligations. In 1897 near Saint Petersburg, Eleonora and Thomasz danced on stage together for the last time. He then continued on the road alone as a dancer. On a prior trip to Finland, he had become involved with another ballet dancer. Eventually this led to a permanent separation from his wife. Accordingly his relationships with his children suffered; he saw them infrequently.

Eleonora on her own established the family's permanent residence in Saint Petersburg. For years she had struggled with being on the road continuously while caring for her three children. A large flat she rented and opened a pension. Bronislava (Broni) records that her brother Vaslav (or Vatsa) became bitter and years later turned against his father because of the suffering endured by his mother.

=== Her brother Vatsa ===
"By nature Vaslav [Vatsa] was a very lively and adventurous boy." In her book Early Memoirs Nijinska writes about the adventures of young Vatsa, older than her by 22 months. Living with a mother and father who danced on stage and were regularly traveling on tour, the children acquired an intrepid attitude and a physical prowess in everyday life. The two parents encouraged their children's athletic development and, while scolding misbehavior, were not punitive. Curiosity drove Vatsa to explore his frequently-new neighborhoods, sometimes crossing parental lines. His bravery and daring on rooftops impressed Broni.

How Vatsa loved to climb! Whenever he was at the top of a tree, on a high post, on the swing, or on the roof of our house, I noticed a rapturous delight on his face, a delight to feel his body high above the ground, suspended in midair.

Vatsa investigated the strange streets of different towns and cities where the family's theatrical life took them. Along the way he was training his body. It became an instrument of strength and balance. Seemingly without fear he relished his freedom. His mind took innovative turns, which his body followed, or vice versa. Often Broni was invited along. From Vatsa's adventures she, too, acquired a body unusually trained for dance.

=== Childhood dance skills ===
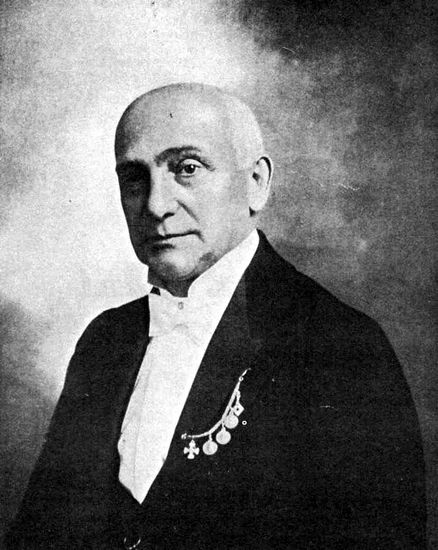
Enrico Cecchetti, St. Petersburg, c.1900

Her parents not only were dancing on stage; they also taught ballroom dancing to adults and had special dance classes for children. Early on they instructed their daughter in folk dances: Polish, Hungarian, Italian, and Russian. She learned ballet, together with all kinds of different dance steps. She picked up some acrobatic techniques from her father, who would 'talk shop' and trade skills with circus performers. Later she was able to draw on this rich experience in her choreographic works.

Broni Nijinska was not quite four when she made her theatrical debut in a Christmas pageant with her brothers in Nizhny Novgorod. She always seemed familiar with being on stage, in children's skits or to make brief appearances on the adult stage. Her aunt Stepha, her mother's elder sister, had retired from performance but was teaching dance in Vilno; she helped Broni. Dancers with her parents would give her lessons or tips. After their parents' separation, her brother Vaslav Nijinsky entered the Imperial Theatrical School. When she was about nine years old, Broni began ballet lessons with the famous Enrico Cecchetti. He quickly recognized her skills.

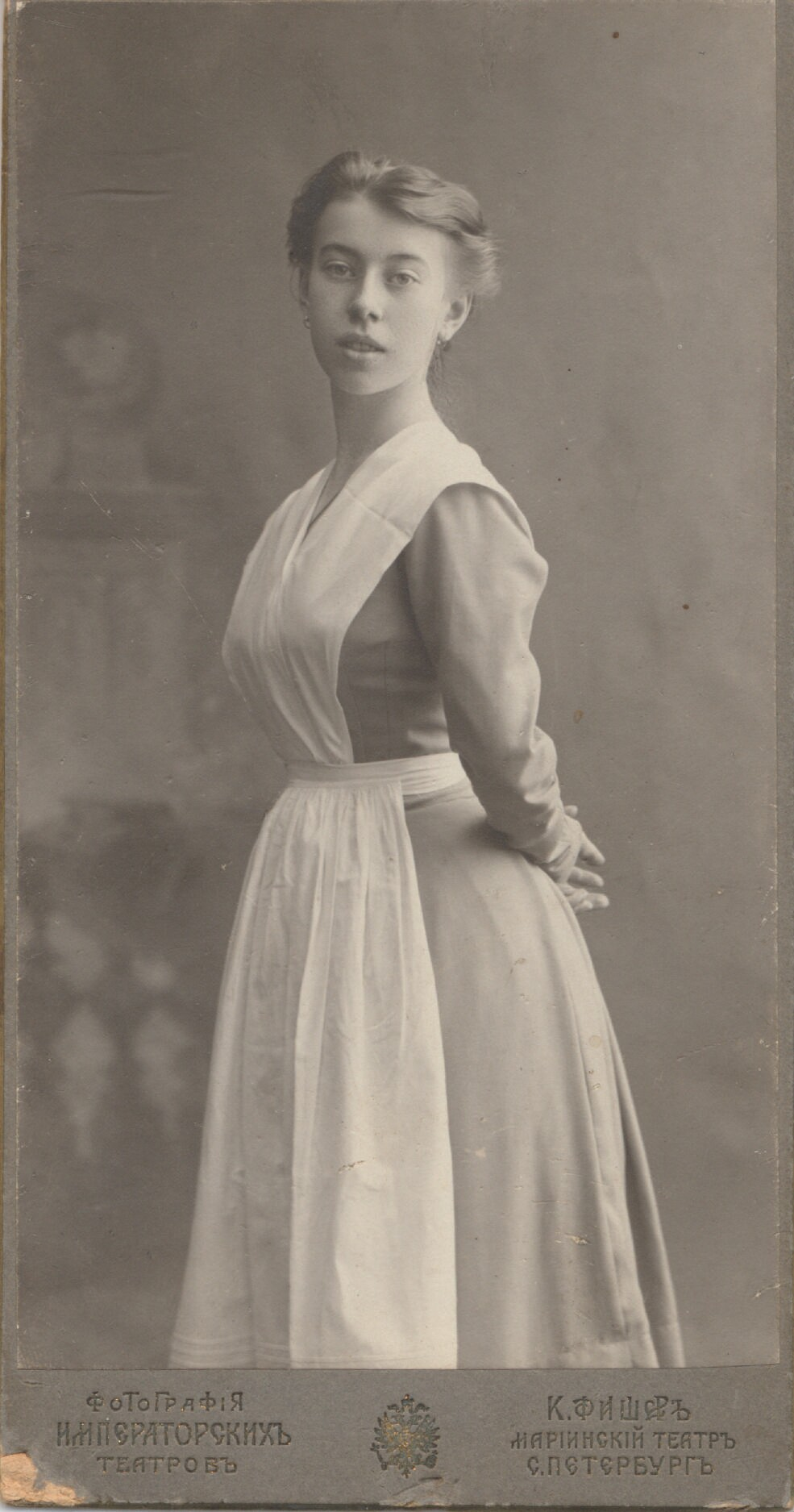
Nijinska, graduation picture, 1908

=== Imperial Theatrical School ===
In 1900, Bronislava was accepted into the state-sponsored school for performing arts. Her brother Vaslav had entered it two years before. Located in Saint Petersburg, it offered a multi-year program. As with Vaslav's acceptance, her mother had enlisted support from various people linked to ballet, including Stanisław Gillert and Cecchetti. Present at the entrance examination were 214 candidates ready to demonstrate their dance abilities. Legendary ballet master Marius Petipa participated in the trials, as did Cecchetti and Sergei Legat. Twelve girls were accepted.

Bronislava graduated in 1908, taking 'First Award' for achievement both in dance and in academic subjects. Seven women graduated that year. In addition to her diploma she was enlisted as an 'Artist of the Imperial Theatre'. It was a government formality which assured her of financial security, and of the privileged life of a professional dancer.

== Of Vaslav Nijinsky ==
=== His influence while at Ballets Russes ===
Perhaps her brother Vaslav Nijinsky had the greatest influence on Bronislava Nijinska and her career. In Nijinska's memoir several times she describes that Vaslav from a young age followed his overwhelming curiosity. Although his dancing skill was praised in school and he learned several musical instruments, she notes his low academic performance; she attributes it to his disinterest and impatience. Instead he'd set off with daring to explore the neighborhoods and test his physical limits. This contributed to his becoming an incredible dancer. At Mariinsky Theater he quickly rose and at Ballets Russes he became famous almost overnight. Soon Vaslav was performing as a star principal dancer.

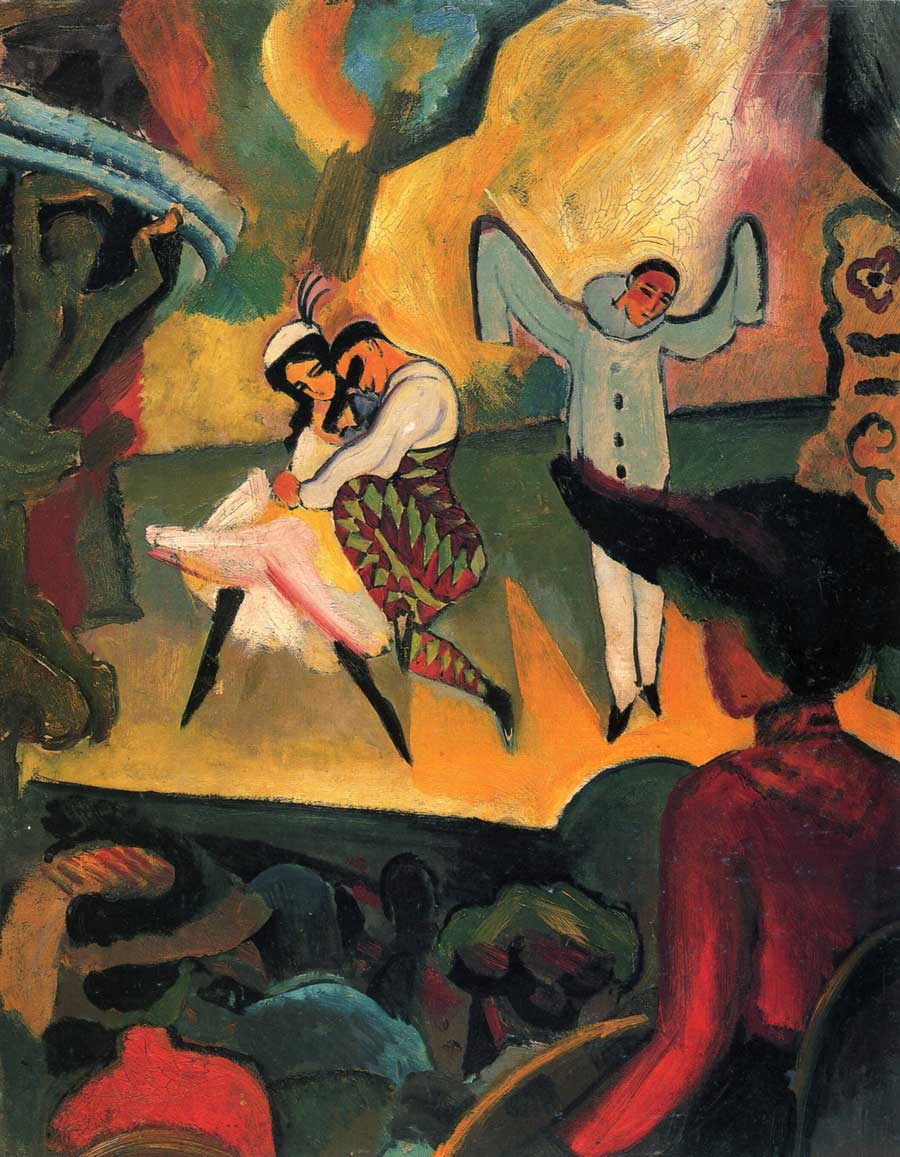
Ballets Russes by August Macke, 1912

As his pupil she became the first person to know and be influenced by his radically new ideas regarding dance and his desire to substitute a rigorously stylized form of movement for the classical ballet tradition.

She describes his innovations in creating a new Blue Bird role for the ballet The Sleeping Princess in 1907: how he changed the restrictive costume and energized the movements. When Nijinsky created L'Après-midi d'un Faune [Afternoon of the Faun] in 1912 he used Nijinska to rehearse it in secret, to follow with her body his description of the steps one by one.

She similarly assisted him in creating The Rite of Spring. Yet due to her pregnancy, Nijinska withdrew from the role of the Chosen Maiden. Prof. Garafola, however, characterizes it as her brother 'evicting' her from the maiden role in Rite. Nonetheless, Baer writes:

Although Bronislave Nijinska is often identified as the sister of the celebrated Vaslav Nijinsky, she was a major artist in her own right and a key figure in the development of twentieth-century ballet. ... As one of twentieth-century's ballet's great innovators, she transformed the art.

Her 1913 break with Diaghilev

When her brother suddenly married, Diaghilev terminated his position at Ballets Russes. Bronislava Nijinska left the company in solidarity with him.

During a 1913 Ballets Russes tour in South American, Vaslav Nijinsky married Romola de Pulszky. It created controversy in the company and in ballet stories from the tour. As Nijinska explains in her memoirs, Vaslav was very reserved and, other than herself, had few confidants or even close colleagues in the dance world. He was a young man alone on the tour when he wed. He was alone because her pregnancy had kept her in Europe.

Nijinska speculated that, behind the scenes, business decisions had motivated events. By getting rid of Nijinsky, Diaghilev managed to secure financing and the return of the choreographer Fokine to the company. The break left emotional scars, and a sense of betrayal. Diaghilev dismissed Vaslav for reasons other than his September marriage: artistic quarrels over ballet design, his military draft status, and his demand for payments in arrears.

=== 'Saison Nijinsky' 1914, and later ===
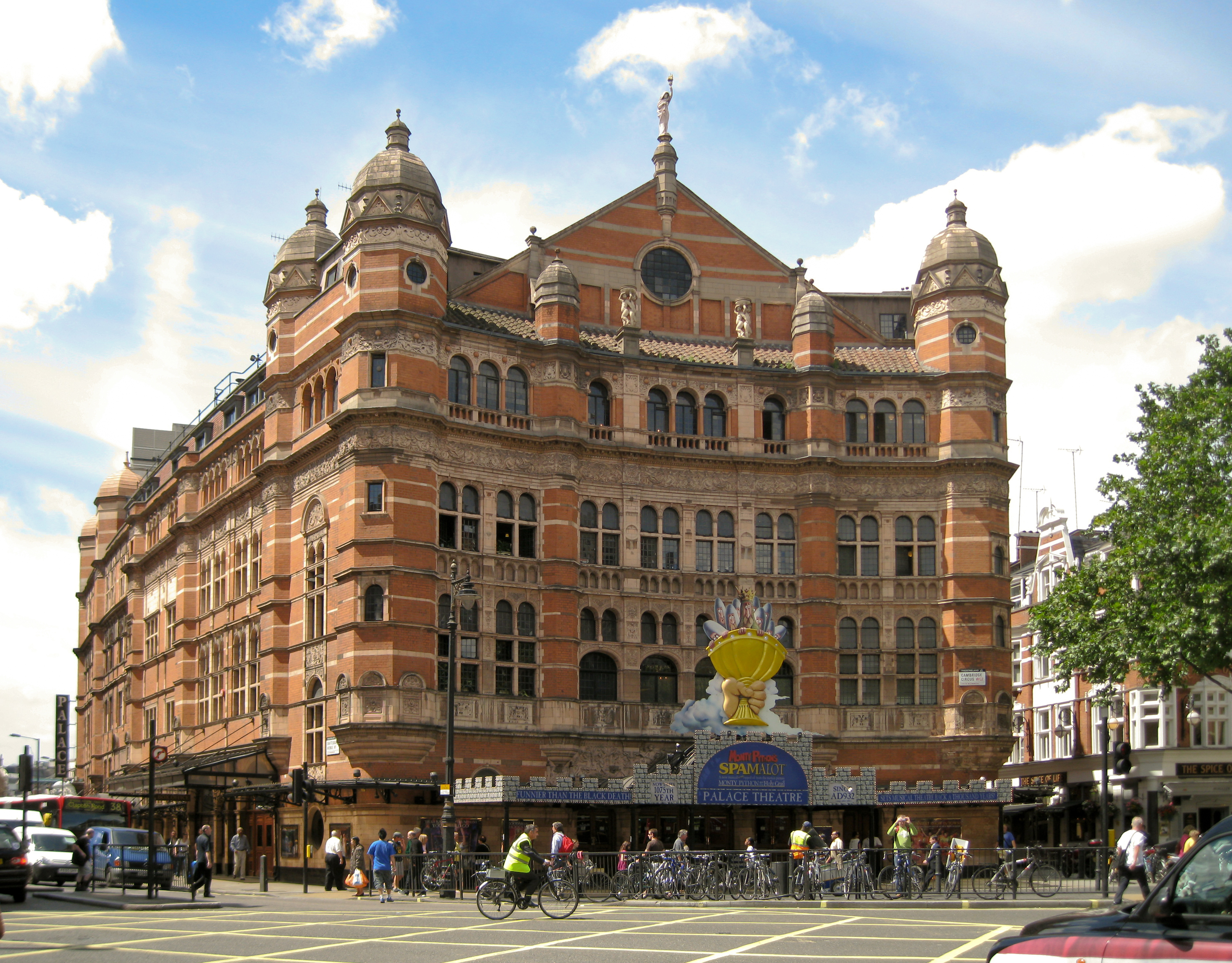
London Palace Theatre

In early 1914 Vaslav Nijinsky on his own started a new ballet company in London: Saison Nijinsky. Bronislava offered her assistance, yet learned there was only a short time to prepare for its premiere performance. Vaslav had signed a contract to open at a dance hall, the London Palace Theatre, in four and a half weeks (March 2). Nijinska quickly decided to return to Russia to recruit the cast, but Warsaw was where the experienced dancers were found. She with others explained her brother's innovative choreographies. She directed rehearsals, as musicians and scores, sets and costumes were arranged.

Nijinska herself was to perform, e.g., with Vaslav in Le Spectre de la rose. Its anticipated premiere was well received. Vaslav's brilliant dancing drew prolonged applause. After performing for two weeks, however, a business dispute developed. It arose when Nijinsky became sick and unable to perform for a few days. It led the theater owner Alfred Butt to cancel the company's season. Nijinsky managed to pay his dancers. Some attributed the company's downfall to Vaslav's erratic emotional tendencies, which had intensified after his recent marriage and his dismissal from Ballets Russes.

Reunited in 1921

Brother and sister became separated for seven years, first by World War I, then by the Russian Revolution, followed by the Russian Civil War. There was little chance for communication as mail service first became irregular and then was discontinued. In 1921 they met again in Vienna, where they remained together for a short time.

== Career as a dancer ==
=== Imperial Ballet in Saint Petersburg: 1908–1911 ===
In 1908, Nijinska was admitted to the Imperial Ballet (then also known as the Mariinsky Ballet and later known as the Kirov Ballet). She followed in her brother's footsteps. In the corps de ballet her first year, she performed in Michel Fokine's Les Sylphides. Under Fokine's gaze and leadership, she was able to directly experience the choreographic vision of this master on the cutting-edge. Both she and her brother Nijinsky, however, left Russia during the summers of 1909 and 1910 to perform for Diaghilev's company in Paris.

Nijinska danced with the Mariinsky Ballet for three years. However, the growth and insights acquired at Diaghilev's Ballets Russes, which was then unexpectedly revolutionizing the ballet world, clearly exceeded that at Mariinsky Theater. Then, suddenly, she felt compelled to resign after the Theater's dismissal of her brother Vaslav, chiefly because his star performances in Paris were making ballet-world headlines. As a result, Nijinska was deprived of her rights respecting the title 'Artist of the Imperial Theaters' and its associated income.

=== Diaghilev and Ballets Russes in Paris: 1909–1913 ===
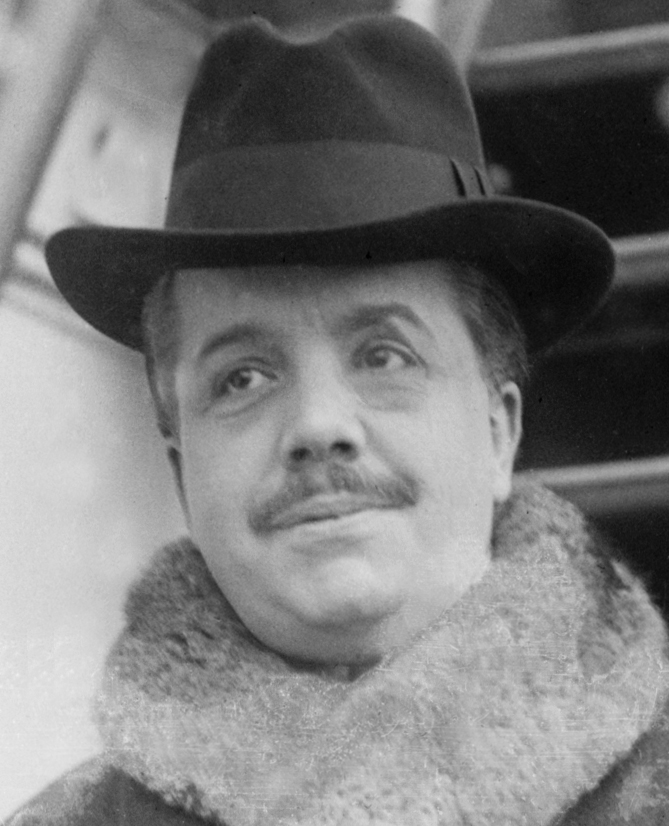
Sergei Diaghilev

Nijinska appeared in the Sergei Pavlovitch Diaghilev's first two Paris seasons, 1909 and 1910. After leaving the Mariinsky, she became a permanent member of his newly formed company, Ballets Russes. In 1912 she had married fellow dancer Aleksander Kochetowsky, and gave birth to their daughter Irina in 1913.

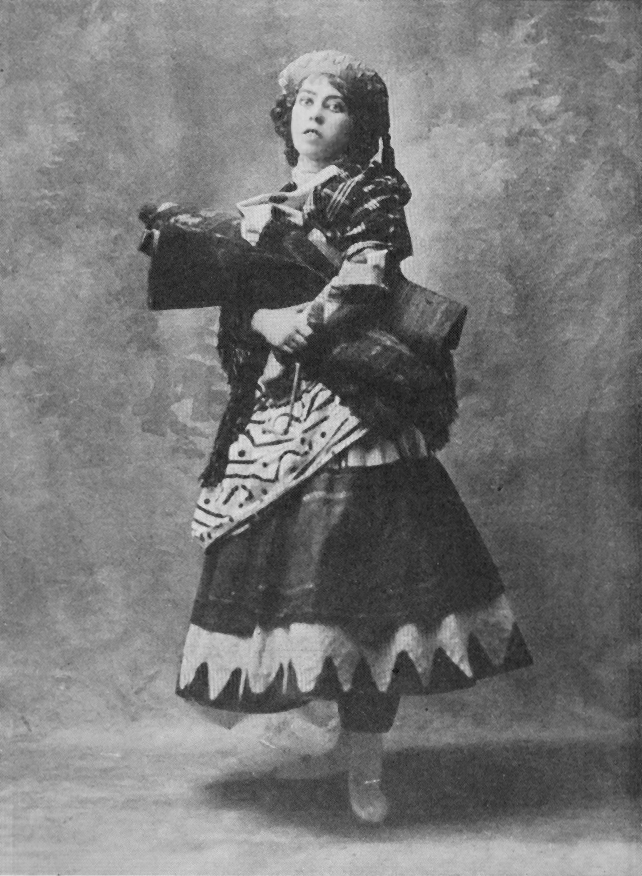
Nijinska in Petrouchka, Fokine's choreography. Ballets Russes, 1913

Here initially Nijinska danced in the corps de ballet, e.g., in Swan Lake (the Czardas), in Les Sylphides (the Mazurka), and in Le Spectre de la Rose. As she developed on the professional stage she was promoted, and eventually given significant parts. Her brother coached her for the role of Papillon [the butterfly] in Fokine's Carnaval (1909). In part danced with feet and hands fluttering in a coordinated rhythm at an accelerated prestissimo tempo, she eluded Pierrot, played in pantomime by Vsevolod Meyerhold. The role of the Ballerina Doll in Petruchka (1912) was also transformed. By changing the doll's demeanor from theatrical in a tutu to realistic in street clothes, Nijinska modernized the role. She also continually kept in character rather than slipping back into the default look of classical ballet. Among others, the pseudo-Hindu dance of the Bayadere Enivree in Le Dieu bleu she did, but did not care for. She struggled and grew as an Odalisque in the popular ballet Scheherazade.

In the 1912 production of Cléopâtre, she at first danced the Bacchanale (replacing Vera Fokine). Then she switched roles, being awarded Karsavina's role of Ta-Hor. "Karsavina danced the role on toe, but I would dance it in my bare feet." She used a liquid body make-up. For Ta-Hor she received treasured compliments from other artists, both for her dance art and for her dramatic interpretation. The next year she performed in her brother's Jeux (Games). Nijinska assisted her brother Vaslav in his creation of the ballet The Rite of Spring, which premiered in 1913. Particularly for the Chosen Maiden role, she carefully follow Nijinsky's instructions as to movement and pose, as the ballet choreography slowly developed. Yet when she became aware of her pregnancy, she told him she'd have to withdraw and miss its opening performance, angering her brother.

In 1914 she danced for Saison Nijinsky (see section above).

=== In Petrograd with Sasha and in Kiev: 1915–1921 ===
After Saison Nijinsky, Bronislava returned to Russia. She continued her ballet career as danseuse, with Sasha her husband as the danseur. During the war and then the revolution, she went on stage in experimental works as well as in classics. In Petrograd the 1915 theatre program listed "ballet by the prima ballerina-artist of the State Ballet Bronislava Nijinska". The program included music by Tchaikovsky, Mussorgsky, and Borodin. She performed in her own choreographed solos, Le Poupee or Tabatierr, and Autumn Song. Her dance savvy was lauded.

In Kiev in addition to dancing, she established her ballet school and began to choreograph programs. She danced in solos while costumed in tunics, e.g., Etudes (Liszt), Mephisto Valse (Liszt), Nocturnes (Chopin), Preludes (Chopin), Fear or Horror (in silence, costume by Exter), and in company performances, e.g., Twelfth Rhapsody (Liszt), Demons (Tcherepnine), March Funebre (Chopin). In 1921 she left Russia, never to return.

=== Diaghilev's Ballets Russes: 1921–1925, and 1926 ===
The entire family went to Warsaw, where Nijinska, her two children, and her mother were issued Polish passports on the basis of baptism certificates. She then visited her brother, who was staying in a psychiatric hospital in Vienna. Rejoining Ballets Russes in Paris, Nijinska first worked in Diaghilev's ill-starred 1921 London revival of the Petipa's classic The Sleeping Princess. Although a money loser, it was popular, and well designed and danced. Nijinska performed the roles of the Hummingbird Fairy and Pierette, for which she received "high critical praise".

In 1922, following a personal request by Diaghilev, she performed the title role in Nijinsky's L'Après-midi d'un Faune during its Paris revival. She had helped her brother with its choreography for its 1912 premier. "Vaslav is creating his Faune by using me as his model. I am like a piece of clay that he is molding ..." Yet these appearance became clearly auxiliary to her new, 'second career' working as the choreographer.

From 1921 to 1924, 1926 with Ballets Russes, Nijinska nonetheless took prominent roles in many of her own dance designs. Accordingly, she performed as the Lilac Fairy in The Sleeping Beauty (1921), the Fox in Le Renard (1922), as the Hostess in Les Biches (1924), as Lysandre in Les Fâcheux (1924), and as the Tennis Player in Le Train Bleu (1924).

=== In Europe and the Americas: 1925–1934 ===
Subsequently, for her own ballet companies and for others, she danced in roles of her own inventions: in Holy Etudes, Touring, Le Guignol, and Night on Bald Mountain (all 1925); for Teatro Colón in Estudios religiosos (1926); in her Capricio Espagnole per Rimsky-Korsakoff in 1931; and in the 1934 ballet based on Hamlet per Liszt: the title role. She performed into the 1930s, at venues in Europe and the Americas.

As Nijinska reached her forties, her performance career neared its end. What caused her trouble, and hastened the close of her performance art, was an injury to her Achilles tendon suffered in 1933 while at Teatro Colón in Buenos Aires.

=== Appraisals, critiques ===
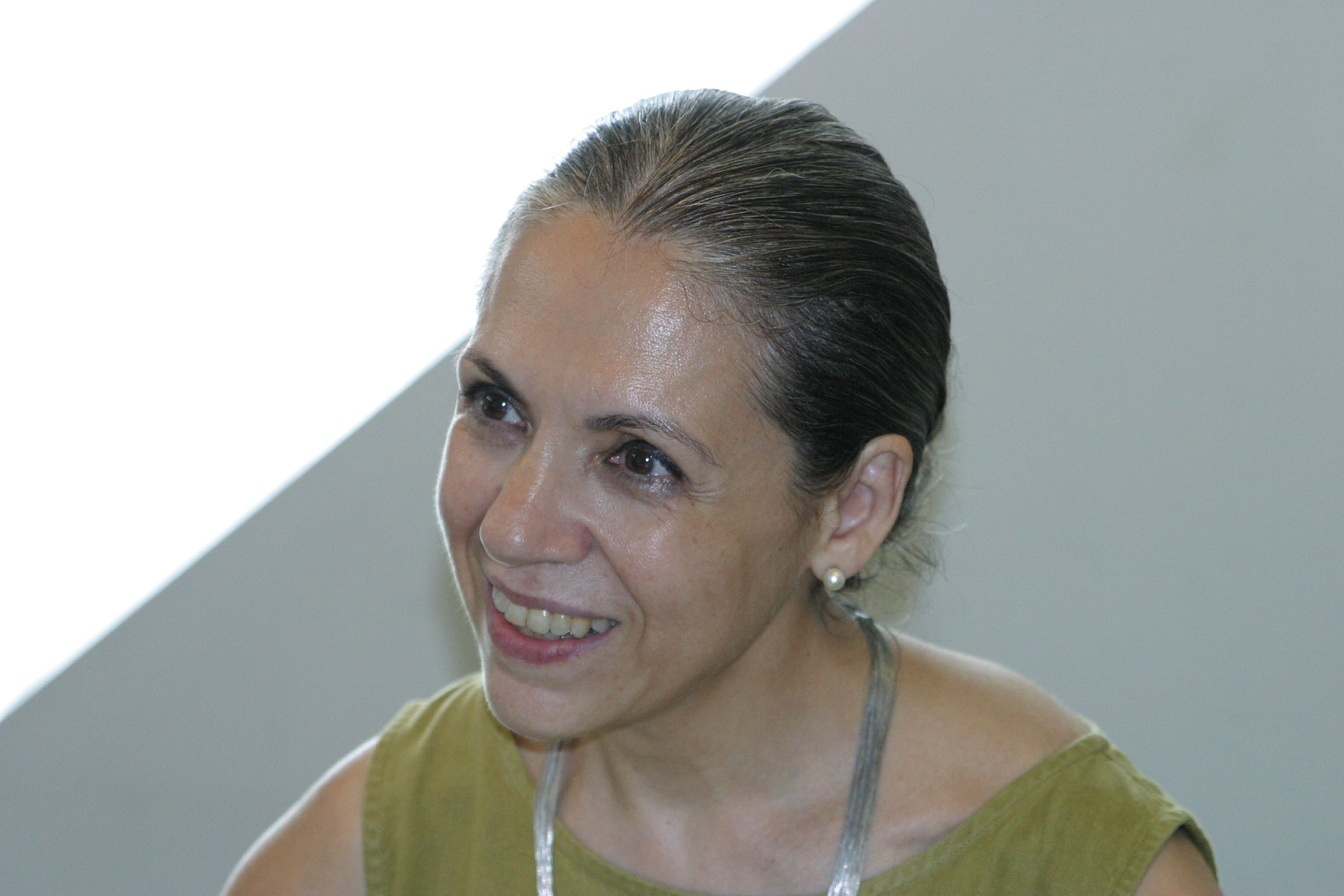
Prof. Lynn Garafola

Her qualities as a dancer, of course, are distinct from her more celebrated choreography. Comments by several professional colleagues were collected by the New York ballet critic and author Lynn Garafola:

"She was a very strong dancer, and danced very athletically for a lady, and had a big jump," commented Frederic Franklin, a dancer and ballet master. "She had incredible endurance, and seemed never to be tired," recalled Anatole Vilzak, who was a principal dancer in many of her mature choreographies. English dancer Lydia Sokolova, noting her lack of makeup, thought she appeared "a most unfeminine woman, though there was nothing particularly masculine about her character. Thin but immensely strong, she had iron muscles in her arms and legs, and her highly developed calf muscles resembled Vaslav's; she had the same way of jumping and pausing in the air." Alicia Markova, a prima ballerina absoluta of Britain, concluded that Nijinska "was a strange combination, this terrific strength, and yet there was a softness."

The composer Igor Stravinsky, to whose music she created several fine choreographic works, wrote that "Bronislava Nijinska, sister of the famous dancer [is] herself an execellent dancer endowed with a profoundly artistic nature." After helping her brother Vaslav for many months in his laborious design of the 1913 ballet The Rite of Spring (music by Stravinsky), she found she'd become pregnant. She could not then take to the stage to perform the star role as the sacrificial maiden. Frustrated, Vaslav then screamed at her, "There is no one to replace you. You are the only one who can perform this dance, only you, Bronia, and no one else!"

Nancy Van Norman Baer in her book on Nijinska writes, "Between 1911 and 1913, while [her brother] Nijinsky's fame continued to soar, Nijinska emerged as a strong and talented dancer." Author and critic Robert Greskovic describes an all-too-common understanding of her gifts, "Nowhere near the beauty and exemplar of her art that Pavlova and Spessivtseva were, Bronislava Nijinska (1891–1972) instead began to make her mark as a choreographer."

Yet Nijinska must have truly excelled as a dancer. When only a young student, her prowess on the dance floor had been recognized by top professionals. "If Marius Petipa patted her approvingly on the head and Enrico Cecchetti placed her, at age eight, front and center in his class between two prima ballerinas, she must have been good." Yet before the First World War her brother's legendary dance skills had overshadowed her own. The editor of The Dancing Times, however, wrote years later of her dancing in the 1921 London performance by Ballets Russes of The Sleeping Princess:

Nijinska ... appeals to me as the most versatile dancer of the entire company. Her technique in her classical numbers is beyond reproach ... and her mime and personality in the demi-charactère dances are most convincing.

An early signature of hers was a tough "virility". "Her own roles were packed with jumps and beats". In her prime, Nijinska crafted to combine her strength with an emotional touch "unexpectedly poignant". She liked the flow of movement on the stage.

== As a choreographer ==
"In her lifetime Nijinska choreographed over seventy ballets, as well as dance sequences for numerous films, operas, and other stage productions." An annotated, chronological catalogue of her choreographies is presented by Nancy Van Norman Baer in her book on Nijinska. Her early experiences in choreographic arts involved the assistance she gave her brother Vaslav Nijinsky in his choreographic works for Ballets Russes. She had then tried out on the dance floor the initial stages of various steps created by him.

== World War and Kiev ==
=== During war and revolution, 1914–1921 ===
At the start of World War I, Nijinska and her husband and daughter, and her mother, were caught on the eastern side of the Eastern Front. Her brother Vaslav was on its western side, eventually in Austria.

The Russian art world in the early twentieth century was often innovative and experimental. "Russian art before the October Revolution had held aloof from revolutionary Marxism." Thus the composer Igor Stravinsky distinguished clearly between the pre-war conservative fetters on art and the subsequent straitjacket eventually imposed by the Communist Party. For a few years following the war-born 1917 revolution, Russia was in chaos, and many artists managed to operate somewhat independently of Soviet politicians and their totalitarian ideals.

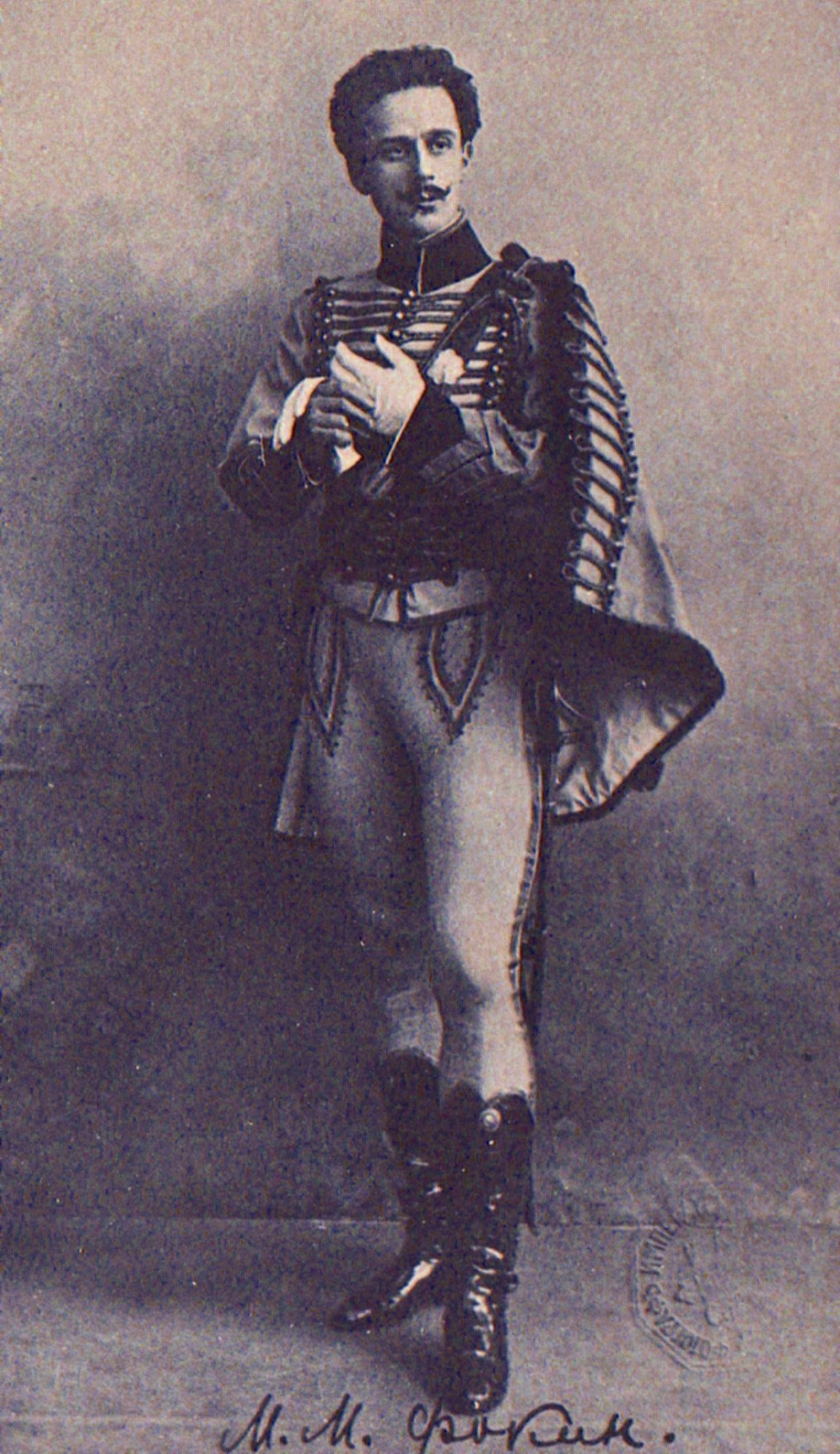
Choreographer Fokine in pre-war ballet costume

==== Petrograd, her first choreographies 1914–1915 ====
At the start of World War I, Nijinska, her husband Aleksandr Kochtovsky ('Sasha', married in 1912), and their infant daughter Nina returned to Petrograd (then the Russian capital's new name). Nijinska had long considered the city her home; it was her last time living there. She found work teaching ballet to Cecchetti's students. Newspaper accounts report that Bronislava and Aleksandr met their former colleagues from Ballets Russes, and danced alongside them. Included were Michel Fokine and Tamara Karsavina, and as well the Bolshoi's Mikhail Mordkin.

Both became leading dancers at the Petrograd Private Opera Theatre. In 1915 Nijinska produced her first choreographies: Le Poupée [The Doll] (or La Tabatière), and Autumn Song. These creations were for her solo performances at the Narodny Dom Theatre.

She was twenty-five. The 1915 program described her as "the celebrated prima ballerina-artist of the State Ballet". The music for her dance creation Autumn Song was by Pyotr Ilyich Tchaikovsky, and for The Doll by Anatoly Liadov. On that program, performed at the Narodny Dom [People's House], were also ballets choreographed by Michel Fokine of Ballets Russes, to be danced by Nijinska and her husband. Her choreography for Autumn Song, "the more important" of her two solos, "owed a debt to Fokine".

==== Kiev 1915–1921, her 'École de Mouvement' ====
In August 1915, the family moved to Kiev. Nijinska's husband 'Sasha' Kochtovsky became ballet master at the State Opera Theater. There they both worked on ballet scenes for the operas, and on staging dance divertissements and ballets. In 1917 Nijinska began teaching at several institutions: the State Conservatory of Music, the Central State Ballet Studio, the Yiddish Cultural Center Drama Studio, and the Ukrainian Drama School. In 1919, after their son Leon was born, after her School of Movement was opened, her husband Sasha left the family and traveled alone to Odessa.

===== Treatise on choreography =====
Nijinska's "theoretical speculations" about modern ballet apparently began to crystallize. During a short stay in Moscow after the 1917 October Revolution, Nijinska started her treatise: The School of Movement (Theory of Choreography). It was published in 1920 but has become lost to posterity, like much of the dance materials she created in Kiev. The only remnant of it apparently is a 100-page 'manuscript' found "scrawled" in one of her exercise books.

In a short essay published in 1930, however, she apparently recapitulated her key ideas: "On movement and the school of movement". Nijinska writes:

Just as 1. Sound is the material of music; and 2. Colour is the material of painting; so 3. Movement constitutes the material of dance. ... The action of movement should be continuous, otherwise its life is interrupted. ... In choreography, transition should be movement. ... [T]he position of the body [a] result created by movement. ... [C]horeographic movement must have its own organic being (different in each composition), its own breathe and rhythm. ... [The artist] sings the movement of his dance [so that] the spectator ... hears with his eyes the melody of [its] movement ... The artist [of dance] must perfectly see and know movement in its entire nature, must work the movement as the material of his art. ... [C]lassical dance teaches only separate pas--movements. The secret of thinking and acting between positions [is] Movement ...

N. V. N. Baer observes an imbedded neoclassical implication within Nijinska's then radical theory of dance, 'the school of movement', i.e., not the overthrow of balletic tradition leading to modern dance, but the incorporation nonetheless of entirely new modes of movement. "It is in this essay that she documents her search for a new means of expression based on the extension of the classical vocabulary of dance steps."

===== Collaboration with designer Exter =====
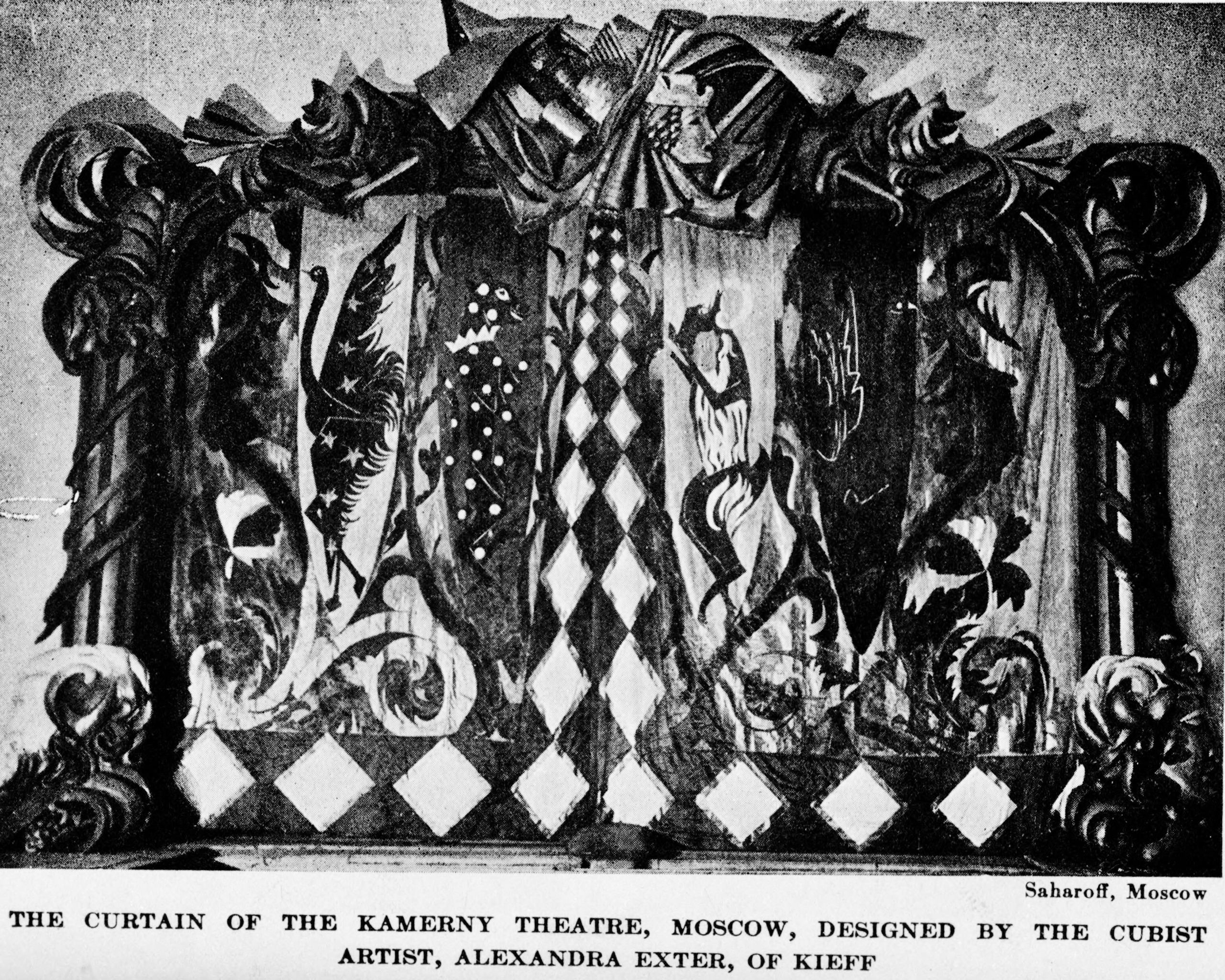
Exter's 1921 curtain design, Moscow.

In 1917 Nijinska met the visual artist Alexandra Exter (1882-1949) in Moskva. Exter's cutting-edge designs employed constructivist ideas. The two traded their views on modern art and the theater. So began a long and fruitful collaboration on various dance projects, with Exter designing sets and costumes. The working relationship that formed endured into the 1920s, after each had independently left Russia, to move to Paris.

Before the war Exter had lived in Western Europe, where she joined "cubist and futurist circles" that were generating popular innovations. Returning to Russia at war's start, Exter first settled in Moscow. With Alexander Tairov at his Kamerny [Chamber] Theater, she had "aspired to create a dynamic fusion of drama, movement, and design known as 'synthetic theater'." In 1918, having relocated to Kiev, Exter opened an art studio, which doubled as a salon for many of Kiev's rising artists.

Art discussions were also held evenings at Nijinska's dance school, where Exter joined in. Their ideas were compatible and mutually reinforcing. Curator/author Nancy Van Norman Baer writes that they became "close artistic associates" and "fast friends".

In addition to Exter, Les Kurbas (1887-1937) worked with Nijinska. As a Ukrainian theater producer and film director, Kurbas was a leading arts figure in Kyiv and a promoter of local performance. They entered into a "complementary and deep" collaboration, sharing studio space, movement classes, dancer-actors, and theatrical discussions.

===== Her ballet school and its productions =====
In February 1919 in Kiev, she opened her dance school called L'Ecole de Mouvement [School of Movement]. This was shortly after giving birth to her son Léon. Her school's philosophy was to focus on preparing dancers to work with innovative choreographers. Among ideas she taught her students: flowing movement, free use of the torso, and a quickness in linking steps. She wanted her students ready for cutting-edge ballets, like those she had assisted her brother in designing, e.g., The Rite and Faune. As she stated in her Kiev-era treatise/essay "On Movement and the school of movement":

"Today's ballet schools do not give the dancer the necessary training to work with choreographic innovators. Even the Ballet Russes ... did not create a school to parallel its innovations in the theater." [86/87] Yet historically, regarding Vigano, Noverre, Vestris, Didelot, Taglioni, Coralli, Petipa: "the danse d'ecole absorbed all the achievements of these choreographers. ... [They] did not destroy the school with their innovations, but only enriched it." [87]

Under the aegis of this school she staged concerts with her own choreographed solo dances. Included were "her first plotless ballet compositions": Mephisto Valse (1919), and Twelfth Rhapsody (1920) music by Liszt, and Nocturne (1919) and Marche Funèbre (1920), music by Chopin. These solo dances may be "the first abstract ballets" of the 20th century.

In many of her productions her students danced for the public, among whom Serge Lifar was the most outstanding. Accordingly, she began to receive broad recognition as a choreographer. Then, invited by the Ministry of Arts, Nijinska mounted a full theatrical production of the Tchaikovsky ballet Swan Lake. She adapted the classic Petipa and Ivanov choreography of 1895. Her success involved trimming the ballet's difficulty to fit the level of her weaker students. The performance was held at Kiev's State Opera Theater.

===== Reasons for leaving Kiev =====
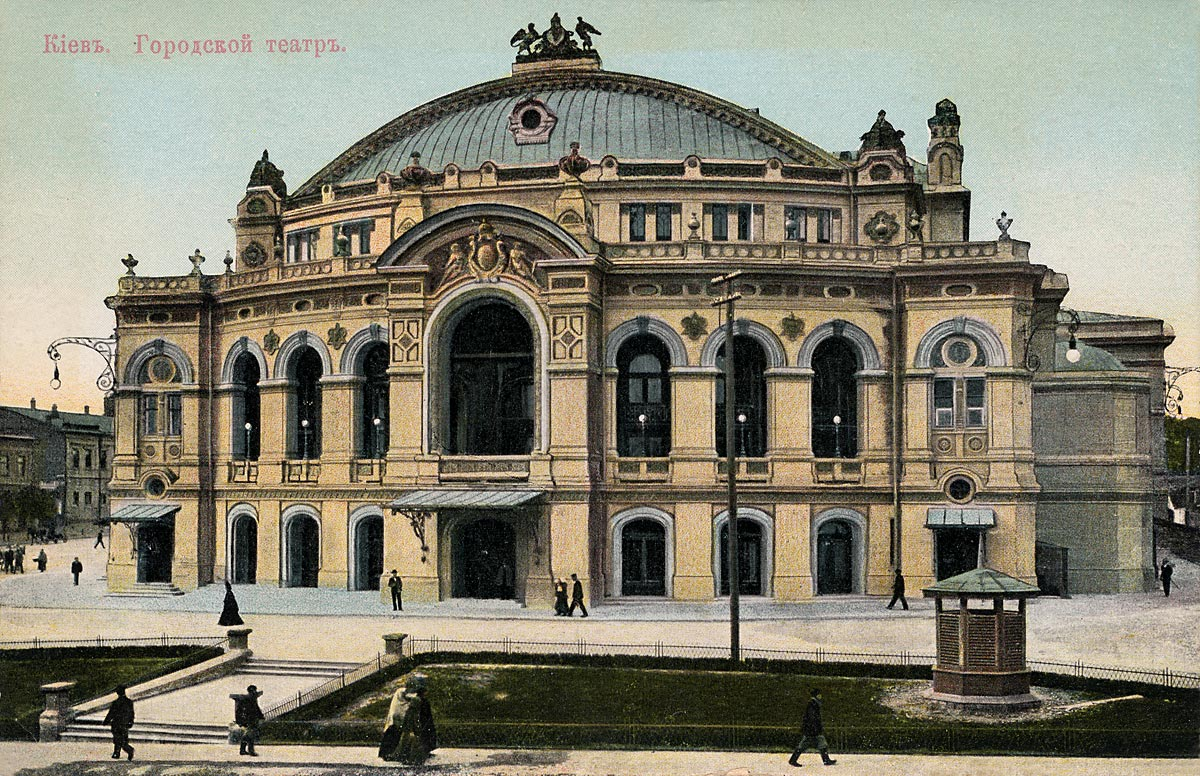
Kyiv Opera House, early 1900s.

It had been reported in the literature that Nijinska and family left Kiev in 1921 in order to visit her brother Vaslav Nijinsky in Vienna, after learning of his deteriorating health. Yet she learned about her brother in 1920, when the Russian Civil War prevented travel.

Based on recent research, Prof. Garafola describes a different and suppressed reason. The Cheka, as the notorious Soviet security police was then called, in early 1921 stepped up its harassment of her and her students. Her artistic independence was confronted and by April L'École de Mouvement had been closed.

The school "had given her a new life and an identity of her own as a modern artist. It was her child, the home of her imagination, a community of friends and devoted followers, the catalyst and expression of her creativity. In the weeks that followed [its closing] she quietly made plans to leave.

With others, Nijinska entertained conflicting views, and mixed emotions, about the old Russia and its demise in the Revolution and horrific Civil War. The aristocratic art form, however, survived under the proletarian dictatorship, interpreted as a strange form of socialist realism. She came of age as an artist of the imperial school, yet at first the Russian Revolution seemed to open doors, as if the avant-garde of Art, before its officials closed her ballet school and company in Kiev. Yet Nijinska did not become anti-Soviet.

She traveled under false pretenses west out of Kiew, assisted by other dancers. She'd taken her two children, Irina aged seven and Leon aged two, and her mother of sixty-four years. After she bribed the Soviet border guards, they waded across the Bug River into Poland, arriving in early May, 1921. She was able to obtain a Polish passport.

Several weeks later in Vienna the four travelers visited her brother Vaslav, his wife Romola and their children Kyra and Tamara. His health, however, had deteriorated since 1914, their last meeting. Once widely-celebrated as the "god of dance" he had not performed since 1917. Despite such sadness, the family was reunited. Broni found income by working at a cabaret in Vienna.

At this point Diaghilev sent her an invitation; he included train fare. Her two children she entrusted to her mother's care. Nijinska then departed for Paris to rejoin in 1921 Ballets Russes. In comparison, in 1924 Balanchine and Danilova left Bolshevik rule, then joined Ballets Russes.

== With Diaghilev in France ==
=== Ballets Russes of Paris and Monte Carlo 1921–1925 ===
The company staged ballets for twenty years, starting with its 1909 opening of La Saison Russe in Paris, and ending in 1929 when its founder Sergei Diaghilev died. He had directed the company's operations: both the business and the theatrical (music, choreography, dance, decor and costumes). He chiefly worked with five choreographers, more or less in sequence: Fokine (1909-1912, 1914), Nijinsky (1912-1913, 1917), Massine (1915–1920, 1925-1928), Nijinska (1921-1925, 1926), Balanchine (1925-1929). Diaghilev's "successive phases" are described as: "reform (Fokine), modernism (Nijinsky and Massine), and ... constructivism and neoclassicism (Nijinska and Balanchine)." The early twenties were Nijinska's time at the helm.

Originally started in Russia by an arts impresario to function as an "exporter of Imperial culture" (initially the ballet productions in Paris), it happened that the company never performed in Russia. By 1918 less than half its dancers were Russian, 18 out of 39. 12 were Polish. The rest were four Italians, two Spaniards, two English women, and a Belgian. The company's ambivalent and attenuated connection to Russia had not survived the 1914–1918 war, the 1917 revolutions, and the Russian Civil War. In 1922 for financial reasons it relocated its base of operations from Paris to Monte Carlo.

==== Her initial choreographic work, and derivations ====
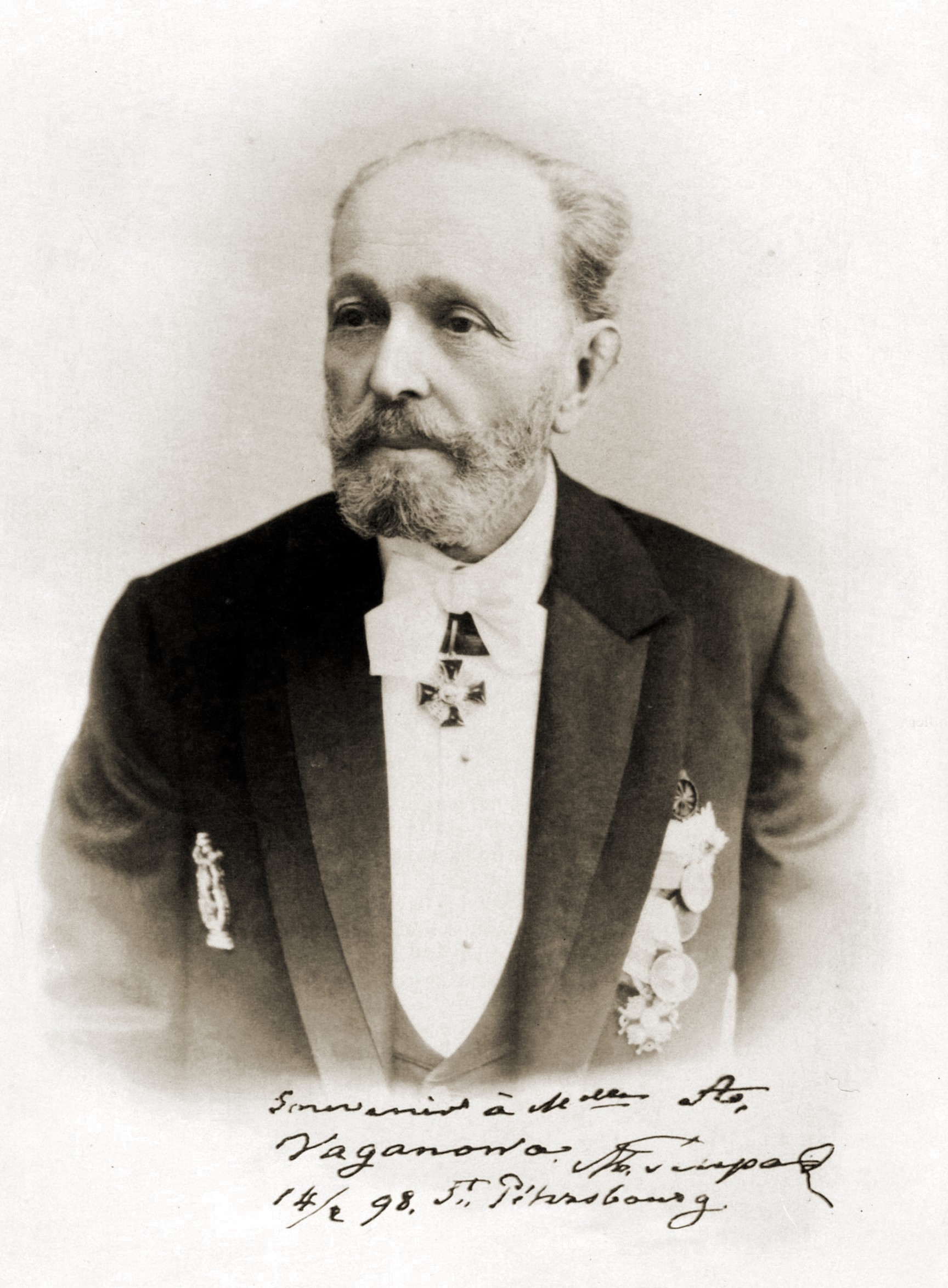
Marius Petipa in 1887

In 1921 Diaghilev asked Nijinska to return to Ballets Russes, chiefly for her choreography. He had become aware of her recent work in Kiev, especially that she had staged the Petipa-Ivanov classic Swan Lake, to music by Tchaikovsky. He had re-engaged her "because" of this demonstration of her abilities. As well as ballet mistress and a principal dancer, she was in line to be the Company's first and only female choreographer. Yet Diaghilev as ever was also cautious. Partly to test the quality of her work, and partly because of his company's financial condition, he first gave Nijinska major tasks in his on-going ballet productions.

===== The Sleeping Princess, originally La Belle au bois dormant (1921) =====
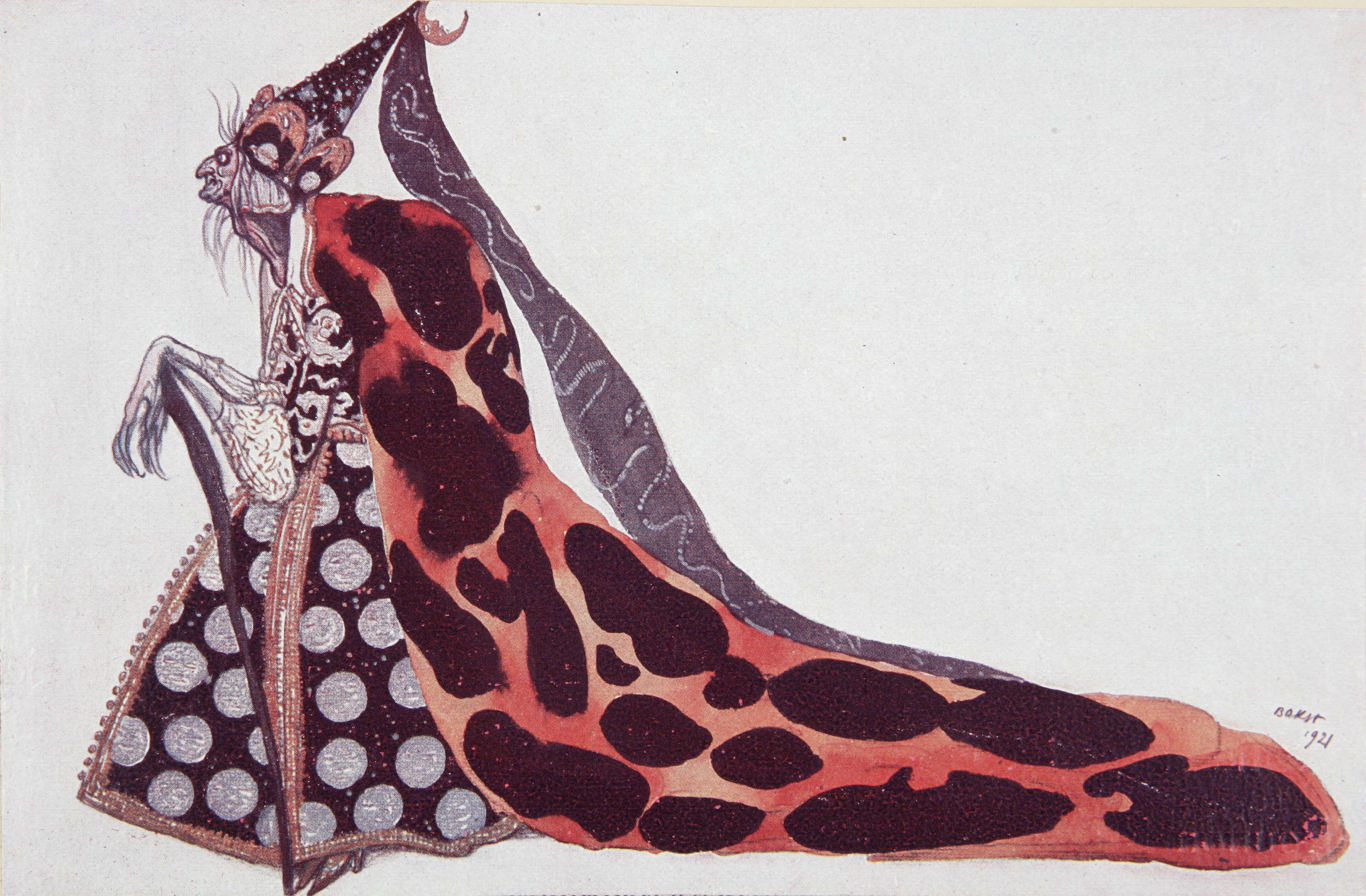
The wicked fairy Carabosse by Léon Bakst, who created 300 costume designs for Diaghilev's lavish 1921 London production of The Sleeping Beauty.

Pjotr Tschaikowski.

As theatrical events unfolded in late 1921, Ballets Russes was confronted with a severe financial crisis. The immediate cause was its lavish London production of the celebrated classic The Sleeping Beauty originally staged in 1890 in Saint Petersburg. Its 1921 version had been renamed The Sleeping Princess apparently because, as Diaghilev wryly observed, following the war the role of titled princess had become a rarity.

The ballet was "one of the great Petipa classics from the old Imperial Russian repertory". La Belle au bois dormant [The beauty in woods asleep] was taken from a French fairy tale of that name by Charles Perrault. Music was specially composed for it by Peter Ilyich Tchaikovsky. Diaghilev extravagantly revived the entire production of Petipa's three-act ballet. Léon Bakst designed the sets which "were of surpassing grandeur and magnificence and no expense was spared ..."

Although the main choreographic credit remained with Petipa, the "Additional choreography by Bronislava Nijinska" was recognized. Her most memorable contribution: to the grand divertissement in Act III she added the rousing hopak for the 'Three Ivans' (Les trois Ivans); it "became one of the most popular numbers". Nijinska designed a half-dozen other, well-crafted choreographic pieces (e.g., "The Marquises", "Blue Beard", "Schéhérazade", "Variations of Prince Charming"). She made other alterations to the ballet, and led its rehearsals. As a principal dancer, she took roles as the Hummingbird Fairy, the Lilac Fairy, and Pierrette. She choreographed a new version of the so-called "finger" variation for herself as the Hummingbird Fairy.

In 1921 in London the key for Diaghilev at Ballets Russes was her mastery of dance, staging and design. The Sleeping Princess production "became a proving ground of Nijinska's choreographic talent. She acquitted herself admirably."

Diaghilev's earlier had, post-war, committed the company to revive the 1890 Russian classic. It was a bold decision which incurred a large financial risk. He aimed for excellence, a show of the tradition's high production values whatever the expense. After viewing The Sleeping Princess many theater critics were skeptical, disappointed by the apparent retreat from an experimental approach previously associated with Ballets Russes. Diaghilev's traditional classic, however, did prove very popular with London's growing audience for ballet, for whom it became an artistic learning experience that boded well for future London dance performances. Yet in late 1921 the London aficionados still small numbers meant that they could not purchase enough tickets to cover its great expense. After a run of several months, attendance began to fall. By early 1922 the truly brilliant production had become a colossal, money-losing disaster.

Nijinska arrived in mid-1921 at the Ballets Russes company. She had come from the harsh realities and creative ferment of 'Russia in revolution'. Her own artistic tastes then clearly favored the experimental Ballets Russes of pre-war days, when Diaghilev was "searching for the creation of a new ballet ..." Yet in 1921 The Sleeping Princess was the focus at Ballets Russes, and her first assignment. She wrote later that Diaghilev's extravagant revival then "seemed to me an absurdity, a dropping into the past". No doubt Nijinska felt the stress resulting from the cultural-artistic dissonance: "I started my first work full of protest against myself."

Over the course of her career, however, Nijinska neither remained a radical champion of rebel experiments, nor did she ever accept as timeless perfection the inherited balletic tradition. While strongly favoring new ideas about the art of movement, eventually she chose to take a middle path: traditional art reconciled with radical innovation, and vice versa.

===== Aurora's Wedding, or Le Mariage de la Belle au bois dormant (1922) =====
After a run of several months, mounting financial pressures had forced the closure of the lavish London production of The Sleeping Princess. In an attempt to recoup his investment Diaghilev then asked Stravinsky and Nijinsky to collaborate in creating from its three acts a shorter version. Together they reworked the dance and music to salvage "a one-act ballet, which he called Aurora's Wedding." It proved very popular and became an enduring commercial success, remaining in the repertory of Ballets Russes companies for decades.

Aurora's Wedding premiered in Paris at the Théâtre National de l'Opéra in May 1922. Since the costumes and decor for the London production had been impounded by creditors, those used were by Benoit from a 1909 production of another ballet, as well as new by Gontcharova. The principal dancers were Vera Trefilova as Princess Aurora and Pierre Vladimirov as Prince Charming. With Petipa Nijinska shared the choreographic credit.

====== La Fête Merveilleuse [The Marvelous Festival] (1923) ======
Itself largely excerpted from her Aurora's Wedding, the "gala benefit pageant" La Fête was performed by Ballets Russes in the Hall of Mirrors at the Palace of Versailles. The gala played to the post-war French taste for theatrical revivals from the 18th-century Ancien régime. The well-heeled audience of aristocrats and art patrons came from all over Europe and from America. Staged by Nijinska, Tchaikovsky's music was reorchestrated by Stravinsky, and the costumes were by Juan Gris.

====== Les Contes de Fées [Stories of the fairies] (1925) ======
Les Contes de Fées was another spin-off from The Sleeping Princess, drawn from fairy tales in Aurora's Wedding (originally in Act III of La Belle au bois dormant). It premiered at Monte Carlo in February 1925. That winter Diaghilev produced it and other ballets in "full dress" even though scenery was not used.

==== Her own ballet creations ====
Nijinska earned her credits as the sole choreographer for nine works at Ballets Russes, eight 1922 to 1924, and one in 1926. All bt one were set to modern musical compositions: three by Igor Stravinsky (two ballets, Renard, Noces, and an opera, Mavra); three by contemporary French composers, Francis Poulenc (Biches), Georges Auric (Fâcheux), and Darius Milhaus (Train Bleu); and, one by Modest Mussorgsky (Nuit, an opera). One work employed baroque music (Tentations). The 1926 ballet Romeo and Juliet had music by English composer Constant Lambert.

===== Le Renard [The Fox] [Baika] (1922) =====
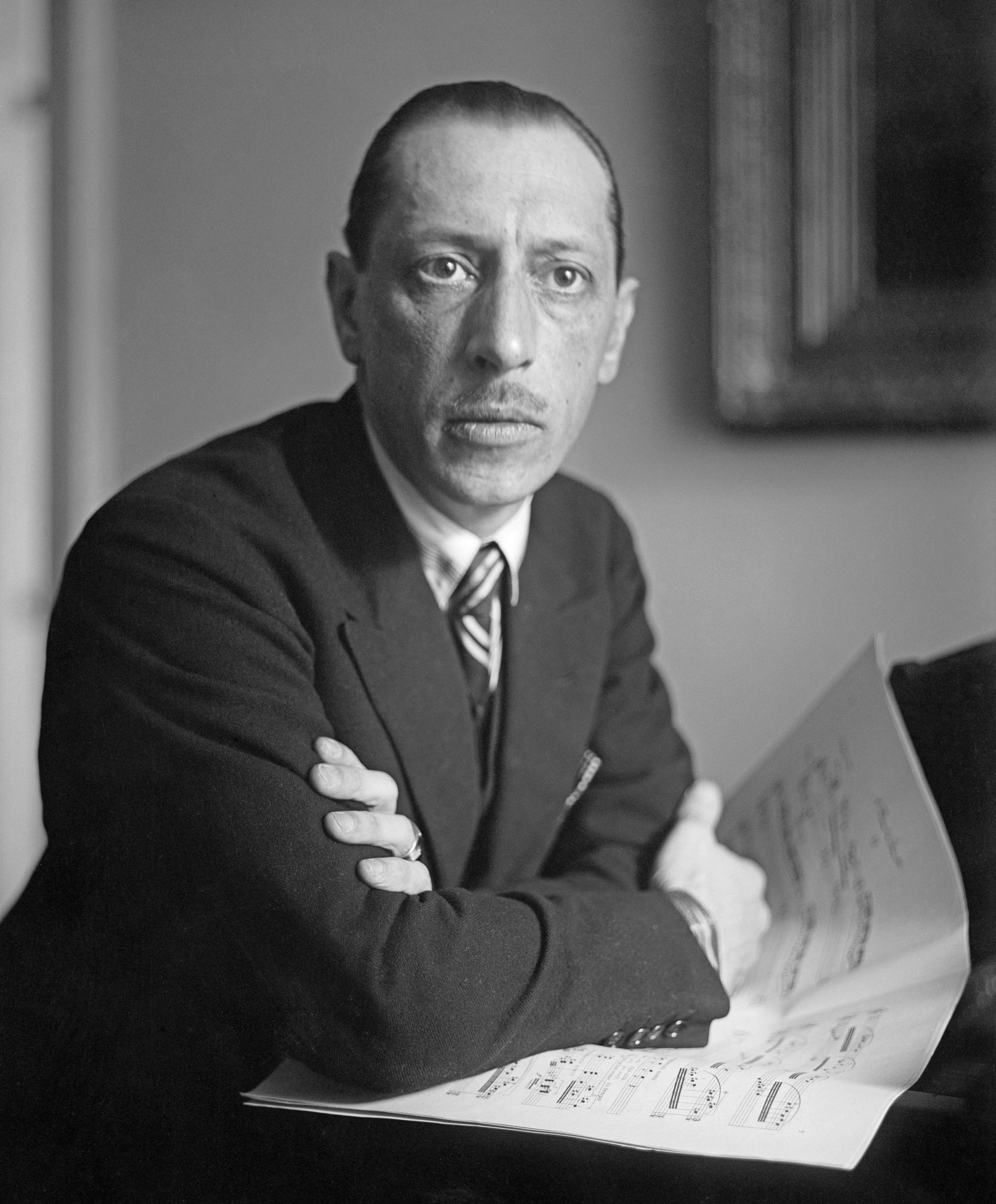
Igor Stravinsky.

Nijinska's first ballet in her tentative new position as choreographer for Ballets Russes was Le Renard, described as a "burlesque ballet with song". Igor Stravinsky composed the music, which was for small orchestra and four singers. Stravinsky also wrote the libretto, i.e., the lyrics. Originally commissioned by a friend of Diaghilev in 1915, it was not publicly performed until 1922.

The principal dancers were: Nijinska (as the Fox), Stanislas Idzikowski (as the Cock), Jean Jazvinsky and Micel Federov (as the Cat, and the Goat). Costumes and sets by Michel Larionov were in a type of radical, modernist style with a "primitive quality".

The plot comes from "Russian preliterary theater" sourced in "a tradition of itinerant folk entertainers" impersonating buffoons and animals. Across Europe, late medieval tales of Reynard the Fox were popular. Here, the Fox (a con-artist) works to trick the Cock (a wealthy peasant) in order to literally eat him, but the Cock is saved by the Cat and Goat. "Disguised first as a nun, then as a beggar, the fox embodies criticism of both social and clerical orders." Baika was the original Russian title of Le Renard.

Nijinska's choreography tended modern. She "juxtaposed movements of animal grace with odd gestures and grotesque postures." The ballet was narrated by singers off stage. Larionov's visual design included simple animal masks for the dancers; the name of each character, e.g., "Goat", was written in large letters on the dance costume.

In her memoirs, Nijinska discusses Fokine's innovative "Dance of the Fauns" (1905). There in the background the many "fauns looked like animals". The young boys who danced them once "tumbled head over heels" which was not in keeping with 'classical ballet' techniques. Yet Fokine claimed the result conformed to the "animal characteristics of the dance." Nijinska then comments:

I, who always spoke against the use of acrobatics in the ballet, made use of somersaults in my very first ballet, Stravinsky's Le Renard (1922). But there was no contradiction. I did not use those steps as a trick but to achieve an artistic aim.

Although Le Renard was ill-received and seldom performed, Stravinsky's harsh music and the childlike costumes were suspected. Yet the ballet had "impeccable avant-garde credentials." "Diaghilev was pleased with Nijinska's work and engaged her as the permanent choreographer for his company." Stravinsky, too, was pleased. He wrote in his 1936 Chronicles of my life:

I still deeply regret that the production [Le Renard] which gave me the greatest satisfaction ... has never been revived. Nijinska had admirably seized the spirit of mountebank buffoonery. She displayed such a wealth of ingenuity, so many fine points, so much satirical verve, that the effect was irresistible.

The premiere of this burlesque ballet also inspired an interesting social event. It was "a first night supper party for Le Renard", planned by Sydney Schiff as a kind of "modernist summit". Invited were "Proust and Joyce in literature, Stravinsky in music, Picasso in painting." Garafola comments that only in these years of Diaghilev "would ballet stand so close to the avant-garde."

===== Mavra (1922) =====
An "opéra bouffe" with music by Stravinsky, it was first performed at the Théâtre National de l'Opéra in Paris, June 1922. The lyric book by Boris Kochno followed a poem by Pushkin, 'A small house in Kolomna'. "The one-act opera did not require any dances, but Diaghilev asked Nijinska to stage the movement of the four singers."

===== Les noces [The Wedding] [Svadebka] (1923) =====
Nijinska created the ballet Les noces ['The Wedding' [original title Les noces Villageoise, in Russian Svadebka]) from the music and libretto by Igor Stravinsky, music commissioned ten years earlier by Diaghilev. In four tableaux, the 24-minute ballet depicts in abstract fashion events surrounding a peasant marriage: the blessing of the Bride, the blessing of the Groom, the Bride's departure from her parental home, and the wedding celebration. Dancers first learning the steps often met some difficulty with the intense group movements of the choreography. "When you are truly moving together your individuality is really evident." Abandoned was the light-hearted sense of folk dance. A realism drawn from her experience of the hard edge of revolution, and tradition, has seasoned Nijinska. She presented her sober observations on folk society, yet also there lurked a vital vision. The heavy, collective mood of predestination is countered by hints of a peasant's wit and ability to survive. After first seeing it, H. G. Wells wrote:

Igor Stravinsky in Paris, by Picasso, 1920.

The ballet Les noces is "a rendering in sound and vision of the peasant soul, in its gravity, in its deliberate and simple-minded intricacy, in its subtly varied rhythms, in its deep undercurrents of excitement ..."

Stravinsky's idea for the score evolved during war, revolution, and exile. His libretto conveys ancient and set patterns, yet his music uses staccato rhythms and a vocal overlay of upheaval. Left little expressed is the wedding as a reassuring ritual of joy. The tone of the work is darker, more anxious, conjuring a "deeply moving evocation" of the ceremony. Nijinska translated it to dance, embodying in the ballet a tragic sense, the fate of both tradition and revolution. The lyrics were taken from a collection of Russian folk songs (the Sobranniye Piesni of Kireievsky), although Stravinsky's libretto is arranged in an unorthodox manner. The phrases were selected for their "typicality" or commonality.

Stravinsky told his friend the conductor Robert Craft that his text for Les noces "might be compared to one of those scenes in Ulysses in which the reader seems to be overhearing scraps of conversation without the connecting thread of discourse." The voices of the singers seem disconnected from the characters they represent. "Stravinsky's composition, while fluid and layered, at times becomes overtly jarring." In form a cantata, the "music accompanying his choral and solo singers came from an orchestra of percussion, dominated by four pianos."

Dance writer Robert Johnson claimed that Stravinsky's text for Les noces manifests his interest in psychology and a collective unconscious of the type posited by Carl Jung. Accordingly, the contrast between a musical "cell" and its elaboration in the score for Les noces represents a dialog between profane time (chronos) and sacred time (kairos), as defined by Mircea Eliade. Nevertheless, Stravinsky described his conception of the ballet's mise-en-scène as a "masquerade" or "divertissement.," whose effect would be comic. Nijinska rejected this concept, and it is her somber vision of the ballet that ultimately prevailed.

The minimalist visual designs, both the costumes and the sets, were by Natalia Goncharova, the color scheme being "earthen gold, blue-grey, and black." Yet "the fanciful, colorful costumes she first proposed struck Nijinska as wrong". Then Goncharova modified her designs to resemble the style of clothes worn by dancers to rehearsals. Balanchine's practical dance clothes for performances "can trace precedents back to Noces." In the end, Goncharova's sparse sets and costume design are now "inseparable from the ballet's musical and movement elements." When Nijinska worked on Les noces:

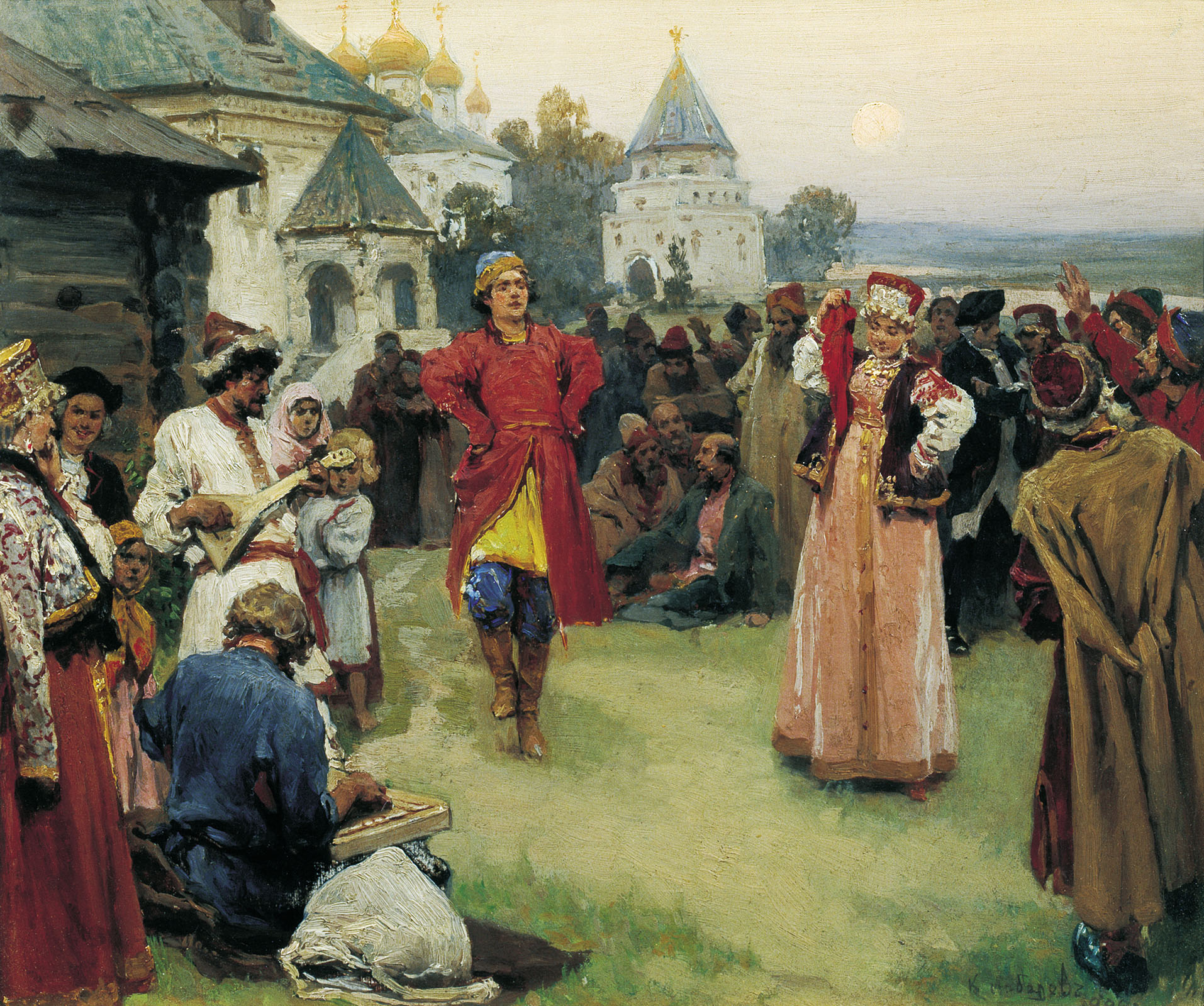
"For Les noces Natalia Goncharova initially proposed a bright, richly colored decor in the old Ballets Russes manner. Nijinska, however, would have none of it." After war and revolution, she saw in "a Russian peasant wedding: not a joyous occasion but a foreboding social ritual in which feelings were strictly contained and limited by ceremonial forms." The ballet must tell this truth and invoke such a "timeless peasant world." Goncharova "immediately took the cue and responded with earthy brown and white costumes cut to simple peasant lines, severe in their simplicity and lack of color. The sets were equally stark." Stravinsky and Diaghilev agreed.

I was still breathing the air of Russia, a Russia throbbing with excitement and intense feeling. All the vivid images of the harsh realities of the Revolution were still part of me and filled my whole being.

Nijinska researched ethnological studies of peasant customs in Russia. Yet in boldly translating to the ballet stage, she seems mostly to follow Stravinsky's modern score. She directed the women to dance en pointe, in order to elongate their silhouettes and resemble Russian icons. The beating sounds of the pointes jabbing the board demonstrates strength (not the ethereal effect previously associated with en pointe). Nijinska's groupings of women move largely in unison. The corps often faces square to the audience, a departure from the "epaulement" found in classical works, which softens the look by angling the shoulders. Toward the end of scene one, the women handle extremely long braids of the bride's hair, greatly exaggerated in thickness, as if the women were "sailors taking up the mooring lines of a boat." The whole piece, tethered to an ancient folk tradition, has an overwhelming sense of a controlled conformity.

Her choreography reflected Nijinska's interest in modernist abstraction. Corporeal forms like the "cart" that takes the Bride from her parental home, and the "cathedral" grouping at the ballet's end, have been abstracted, as also such gestures as the braiding of hair, and the sobbing. The appearance of pyramidal and triangular structures that represent "spiritual striving" furthers this interest in abstraction. It may show the influence of painter Wassily Kandinsky. He had presented the so-called "Program for the Institute of Artistic Culture," his proposed master plan for the arts, including dance, in Moscow in June 1920.

An iconic pose from Les noces has the heads of the women dancers, i.e., the bridesmaids, as if stacked up. Author Jennifer Homans, in defining the ballet's tragedy, comments:

In one of the ballet's most poignant and telling images, the women dutifully pile their faces like bricks on top of one another, forming an abstract, pyramid structure ... The bride sets her face on the top and rests her head despondently in her hands. We see both the individuals (those faces) and their submission to authority and the group ...

Dance critic Janice Berman writes that Nijinska viewed the wedding celebration from her perspective as a woman: "Nijinska was obviously a feminist; the solemnity of the nuptials derives not only from the sanctity of married love, but from its downside---a loss of freedom, particularly for the bride. She loses not only her long, long braids, but also her privacy, her right to dream. The bride's last reverie, after all, comes before the ceremony; she leans her head on her hands, atop a table formed by eight of her friends. After the nuptials, another dreamer takes the bride's place." Also, the critic Johnson points out that Les noces is filled with images of dreamers.

"Les noces was Nijinska's answer to The Rite," a creative continuation of her brother's work, here "a reenactment of a Russian peasant wedding." The ballet movement of the ceremony reflected "not a joyous occasion but a foreboding social ritual." Dance critic André Levinson in his harsh 1923 review called her choreography "Marxist" in which the individual was swallowed up by the masses. Nijinska, however, escaped from her brother's nihilism by following Stravinsky's lead "through the formal beauty and discipline of the Orthodox liturgy." Nonetheless the ballet remained "a modern tragedy, a complicated and very Russian drama that celebrated authority" yet showed its "brutal effect on the lives of individuals."

Dance academic and critic Lynn Garafola, in discussing the ballet scene in the early 1920s, identifies a major competitor to Diaghilev's Ballets Russes. She characterizes Ballets suédois (Swedish ballet) led by Rolf de Maré as a company that had "largely succeeded in edging Diaghilev to the sidelines of avant-garde Paris." Yet Garafola mentions her admiration for the 1922 ballet Le Renard (see above) created by Nijinska for Ballets Russes. She continues:

[I]t was only in 1923 that Diaghilev staged a modernist masterpiece that transcended the best of his rival's offerings. Les noces, probably the greatest dance work of the decade, teamed three of his closest Russian collaborators: Stravinsky, his 'first son', as composer; Natalia Goncharova, as designer; and Bronislava Nijinska, as choreographer.

"Bronislava Nijinska's Les noces [grew] out of boldness of conception without regard for precedent or consequences," wrote John Martin, dance critic for The New York Times. Nijinska herself wrote about Noces: "I was informed as a choreographer [by my brother's ballets] Jeux and The Rite of Spring. The unconscious art of those ballets inspired my initial work."

===== Les Tentations de la Bergère [Temptations of the shepherdess] (1924) =====
This one-act ballet featured baroque music composed by Michel de Montéclair (1667–1737), which was recently orchestrated by Henri Casadesus. The sets, costumes, and curtain were by Juan Gris. An alternative title is L'Amour Vainqueur [Love Victorious]. It opened in Monte Carlo.

In the mid-1920s "a significant part of the Ballet Russes repertory turned away from modernism and themes of contemporary life." This included Les Tentations de la Bergère and the ballet Les Fâcheux, also choreographed by Nijinska. These were "two works produced by the Ballets Russes during the 1920s that focused on themes related to eighteenth-century France. These productions were rooted in France's post-World War I fascination with bygone monarchies and court life."

===== Les Biches [The Does (or 'the girls')] (1924), also called The House Party =====
Poulenc (early 1920s).

A one-act ballet Les Biches ['Les Demoiselles' was once a proposed alternate title] depicts a contemporary house party for singles, with music to 'entertain' by Francis Poulenc. 'Fashionable' scenery and costumes were by cubist painter Marie Laurencin, also French. Poulenc's commissioned music for ballet, which originally included sung lyrics, was a "wonderful chameleon of a score", that was "mischievous, mysterious, now sentimental, now jazzy, now Mozartian ..."

Dance writer Robert Johnson comments that beneath this ballet's sun-washed, Riviera setting lie "shadowy scenes painted by Watteau: the Parc des Biches where Louis XIV trysted, and the forest where voluptuous courtiers rediscovered Cythera, the isle of love... . From the opening notes of Poulenc's overture, significantly scored for flutes and woodwinds, we find ourselves in this bois of ancient gallantry." Poulence described the section titled "Jeux" as, "a kind of hunting game, very Louis Quatorze."

Its January 1924 opening at the Théâtre de Monte Carlo featured "La Nijinska herself" in the cast and, among others, a minor role for Ninette de Valois (she later became director at Sadler's Wells). The French title Les Biches signifies "the girls" or female deer (the plural of doe), which was "1920s terminology for young women; [it] celebrates ballet women as chic young ladies." Several English-speaking ballet companies changed the title, e.g., The House Party or The Gazelles.

"Although Diaghilev to Poulenc praised Nijinska to the heavens ... [he] feared she might be unresponsive to the Latin charm of the Poulenc score." Her first three choreographies for Ballet Russe had been composed by Stravinsky (Renard, Mavra, Noces). Yet "Poulenc and Nijinska had taken to each other enormously ..." During rehearsals, Poulenc remarked that "Nijinska is really a genius" and her choreography's "pas de deux is so beautiful that all the dancers insist on watching it. I am enchanted." Diaghilev concluded:

Poulenc is enthusiastic about Bronya's (Nijinska's) choreography, and they get along excellently together. The choreography has delighted and astonished me. But then, this good woman, intemperate and antisocial as she is, does belong to the Nijinsky family.

The ballet's plot is unspecified. According to Poulenc, an atmosphere of "wantoness" prevails. Apropos of the ballet's ambiguity, Richard Buckle asks, "Have the three athletes who enter this whispering world of women just dropped in from the beach, or are they customers?...It is so delightful not to know." Les Biches was intended to be a modern "fête galante," and in some ways a commentary on Michel Fokine's ballet Les Sylphides.

Nijinska took the role of the hostess of the house party. The hostess is "a lady no longer young, but very wealthy and elegant." Her guests are younger: twelve women in pink and three men dressed as athletes wearing ribbon-like sashes. Additional featured characters include La Garçonne, aka La dame en bleu, an androgynous figure sometimes described as a "page-boy"; and two women in gray dresses who appear to be a couple. The ballet has eight parts, each with a different dance music. The young guests flirt, appear to take no notice, or play dance games in a setting filled with social satire and ambiguous sexuality. The hostess, dressed in yellow, brandishes a cigarette holder as if posing for an advertisement. Balanchine comments that she seems driven to remain in motion, her hands, her desperate dance: she is unable to image herself alone and still. Nijinska "was 'powerful' and 'strange,' a dancer 'intoxicated with rhythm, ... racing against the most breathless 'prestos' of the orchestra." In this role of the yellow-clad hostess, Nijinska

flew round the stage, performing amazing contortions of her body, beating her feet, sliding backwards and forwards, screwing her face into an abandoned attitude on the sofa. She danced as the mood took her and was brilliant.

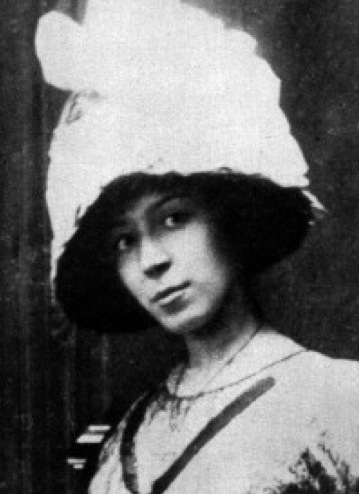
Marie Laurencin (1912)

Dance writer Richard Shead appraised Les Biches as "a perfect synthesis of music, dance, and design ..." He situated it in the aftermath of the radical experimentalism of her brother Vaslav Nijinsky, whose innovations had challenged the classical ballet canons:

The great strength of Nijinska's choreography was its inventiveness, together with the fact that it remained essentially classical. It is easier to see now than it can have been in the 1920s that the future of choreography lay in classicism but in a classicism which was capable of being extended, varied, distorted even, without departing in any fundamental sense from the mainstream vocabulary of classical dance. Nijinska achieved this in Les Biches; Balanchine was to do so latter ...

Following World War I, Diaghilev found it advisable to produce a French-themed work neo-classical in style. Yet the Nijinska's dance vocabulary of Les Biches is not entirely academic; it blends virtuosic classroom steps, exposed lines and pointe work with body building poses, sporting images and references to popular dance forms. In this regard, Les Biches is "the fountainhead of neoclassicism in dance." According to Irina Nijinska, the choreographer's daughter, the famous gesture of La Garçonne upon entering, with one hand held flattened to the side of her face, and the gesture of the female corps de ballet, with one hand raised while resting on an elbow, are both military salutes that Nijinska has abstracted through a technique like Cubism.

In Les Biches, writes Lynn Garafola, Nijinska's choreography "cracked open the gender codes of classical style, transforming a piece of twenties chic into a critique of sexual mores." According to Robert Johnson, "loves of various kinds are portrayed and accepted here seeingly without prejudice." Nijinska has turned the tables, making the ballet's three male athletes the object of a libidinous female gaze. "Nijinska has seized the power to frame the discussion about sex."

Marie Laurencin's decor, according to Garafola, had "the same ambiguous blend of innocence and corruption" as the ballet. It opens in a flood of pink light that is "voluptuously feminine". A host of taboos are explored: "narcissism, voyeurism, female sexual power, castration, sapphism". Garafola a few pages earlier mentions the career importance of her years in Kiev "fired by the Revolution's brave new art". On one level Les Biches appears to creatively conflate the sexual experimentation of post-war Paris and Kiev. Yet Nijinska herself apparently remained somewhat of a skeptic.

Garafola comments that Diaghilev disapproved of the ballet's pessimism, its sour look at gender relations. Portrayed was a femininity "only skin-deep, a subterfuge applied like make-up, a construction elaborated over time by men, not an innate female property." The customary "male bravura dance" is here exposed as pretentious. The ballet "divorces the appearance of love from its reality." Les Biches, surmises Garafola, may be interpreted as disclosing Nijinska's "unease with traditional representations of femininity."

Balanchine, Nijinska's successor as choreographer at Ballets Russes, wrote about her Les Biches describing it as "popular ballet of the Diaghilev era". It was revived several times, he continued, and met with "critical and popular approval".

"Monte Carlo and Paris audiences ... loved it." "Les Biches was very much liked."

The audiences were able "to see themselves and their friends on the stage and be flattered by the comparison: such elegance might well be theirs. The ballet ... was a transmutation and stylization of [a] way of life into a work of art".

"[A] London critic in 1925 claimed that, with Les Biches, 'feminism [has] at last tinged the ballet'." "[W]e all knew long before the curtin went down on the first night that Les Biches was a smash hit."

===== Les Fâcheux [The Mad, or The Bores] (1924) =====
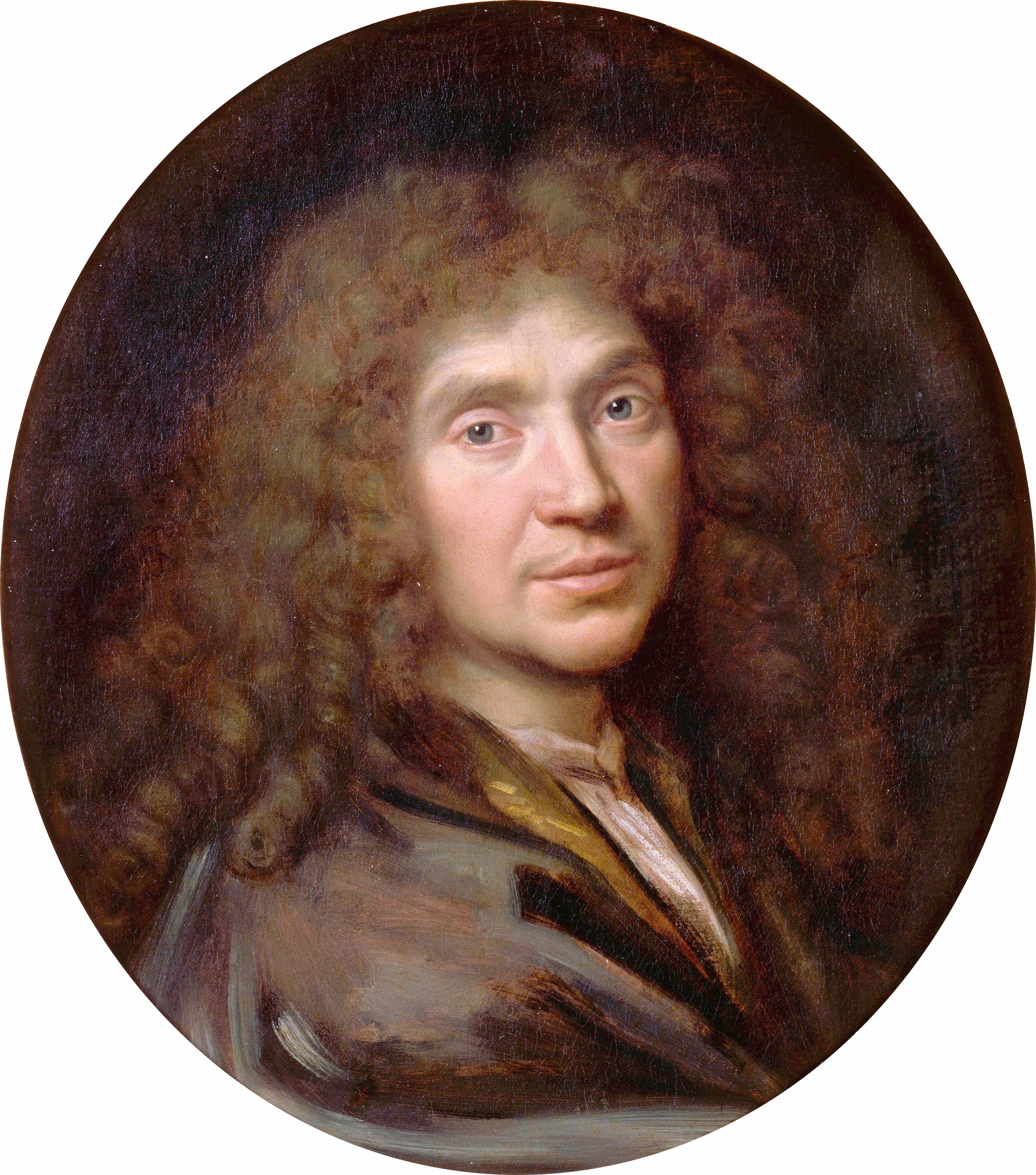
Playwright Molière by Mignard (ca. 1658).

fr:Les Fâcheux was originally a three-act ballet comedy, written by the French playwright, librettist, and actor, known by his stage name Molière (1622–1673). It opened in 1661, with baroque music by Pierre Beauchamp and Jean-Baptiste Lully. Without a plot, characters appear, do a monologue, then exit never to return. "Molière's hero Éraste [is] continually hindered by well-meaning bores while on his way to visit his lady love." Adopted for Ballets Russes, the music was by Georges Auric, with scenery designed by Georges Braque, libretto by Jean Cocteau after Molière, choreography by Nijinska.

Nijinska danced the male role of Lysandre, wearing a wig and clothes of the seventeenth-century. Anton Dolin as L'Elégant danced on point to approximate the baroque era and his performance created a sensation. "Her choreography incorporates mannerisms and poses from the period that she modernized by stylization." Braque's costumes were 'Louis XIV'. The original music, however, had been lost, so that Auric was free to evoke the past with a modern composition.

Georges Auric was associated with fellow French composers Francis Poulenc, Darius Milhaud, and Arthur Honegger, part of a group called Les Six. French writer Jean Cocteau courted the group as representing a new approach to the arts, including poetry and painting. Ballets suédois in the early 1920s commissioned members of Les Six to compose music for its dance productions. Ballets Russes followed suit. Some 1920s music critics dismissed Les Six compositions as musiquette. But current critic Lynn Garafola sees in ballet revivals like Les Fâcheux that employ their music a "gaiety and freshness" in their "unpretentious tunes and depiction of everyday life". Garafola appreciates "the independence of the music in relation to the choreography."

Ballets Russes dancer Lydia Lopokova, however, about Nijinska's ballet Les Fâcheux and similar works, commented that it was smooth and professional, but nothing or no one moved her. She longed for very old-fashioned ballets without abstract ideas, with simplicity and poetry. "Massine and Nijinska choreography clever as it is have too much intellect," she felt.

===== La Nuit sur le Mont chauve [Night on Bald Mountain] (1924) =====
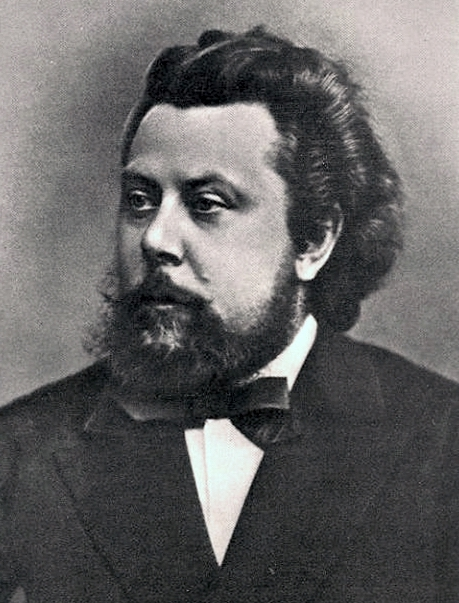
Mussorgsky, 1870

The ballet premiered in April, 1924, in Monte Carlo, with principal dancers Lydia Sokolova and Michel Fedorov. Nijinska's choreography was set to the 19th-century music of Modest Mussorgsky, who was inspired by an old folk legend. The 'bald mountain' here is located near Kiev. The ballet experimented "with costumes that 'reconstructed' the body, transforming its natural shape." Nijinska's sketches "show elongated, arc-like forms." Alexandra Exter designed costumes that "played with shape" and "played with gender".

Nijinska emphasized the ensemble rather than the individual dancer. Sokolova, who danced the role of the Witch, found the ballet a 'remarkable creation', in which "a writhing, whirling mass of bodies... conjured up the most convincing Witches Sabbath I have ever seen". Ninette De Valois called it a ballet of "outstanding merit". In 1937 she wrote, "Time has not obliterated from [my memory] its choreographic brilliance."

Here Nijinska's choreography employed "her inventive use of the corps de ballet as the central figure" rather than a soloist as was the norm. The total effect allowed the "movement of the dancers to blend ... they became a sculpted entity capable of expressing the whole ballet action." Exter also "depersonalized the dancers, clothing them in identical gray costumes." Yet it was "the architectural poses of Nijinska's choreography that gave the costumes their distinctive shape".

Also in Spring of 1924 Soviet choreographer Fedor Lopukhov staged a Night on Bald Mountain ballet to Mussorgsky's music, performed in Petrograd at the former Mariinsky. Among other things, Lupukov was a pioneer in bringing Slavic folklore to dance theater. Here his ballet was self-described as a "buffoonish, devilish spectacle". Choreographically it differed fundamentally from Nijinska's. His ballet's individual parts were played by "first-class character dancers", in which "Chernobog couples with Ezhi-Baba".

In his 1867 symphonic poem La Nuit sur le Mont chauve, Mussorgsky drew on Nikolai Gogol for literary inspiration, on the witches sabbath scene in his 1830 short story St. John's Eve. The composer repeatedly revised the music, later incorporating it into Act III of his unfinished opera Sorochintsy yarmarka (The Fair at Sorochintsy). Mussorgsky himself wrote the opera's libretto, and kept at work on it until his death in 1881. The music was re-orchestrated by Rimsky-Korsakov.

===== Le Train Bleu [The Blue Train] (1924) =====
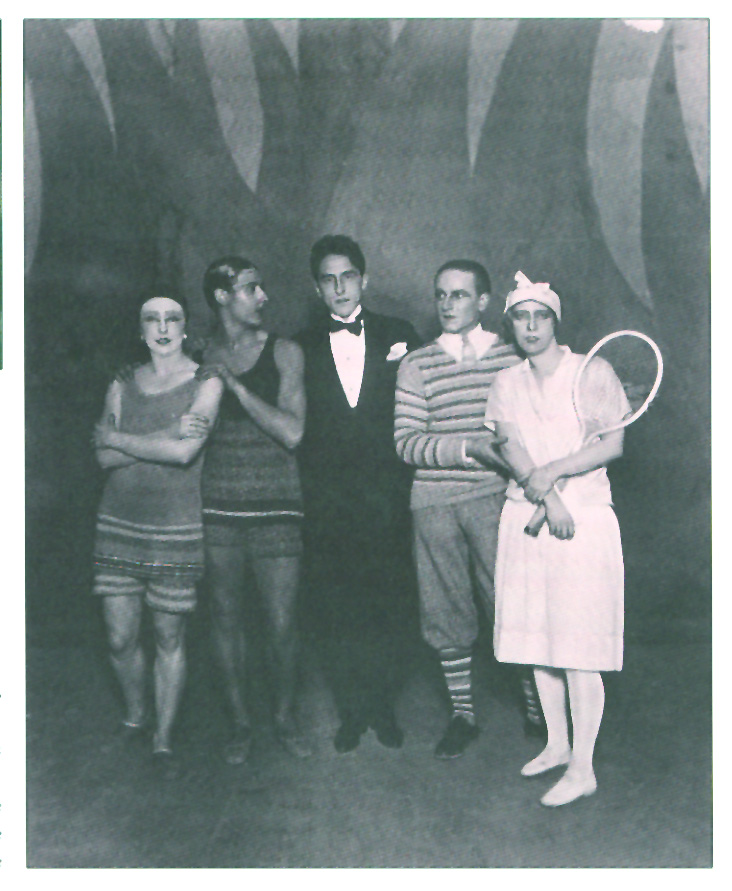
Jean Cocteau (center) and Bronislava Nijinska (far right) with the cast of Le Train Bleu

The ballet Le train blue has been called a 'danced operetta'. Darius Milhaud composed the music, with the ballet libretto by Jean Cocteau, poet and filmmaker. The dancers' wardrobe were designed by 'Coco' Chanel; it included "bathing costumes of the period". The scenery was by sculptor Henri Laurens. The cast of players: a handsome kid (Anton Dolin), a bathing belle (Lydia Sokolova), a golfer (Leon Wójcikowski), and a tennis player (Nijinska).

The Cocteau libretto has a thin plot. Its title refers to the actual Train Bleu, whose destination was Côte d'Azur, a fashionable resort area, specifically Monte Carlo. "The Blue Train used to bring the beau monde down to the south from Paris ..." Diaghilev remarked, "The first point about Le train bleu is that there is no Blue Train in it." The scenario "took place on a beach, where pleasure-seekers disported themselves." Inspired in part by youth "showing off" with "acrobatic stunts", the ballet "was a smart piece about a fashionable plage" [beach].

Nijinska created a special ambiance through the language of dance, she introduced angular and geometrical movements and organized dancers on stage as interactive groups, that alluded to images of sports activities, such as golf, tennis and recreational games on a beach.

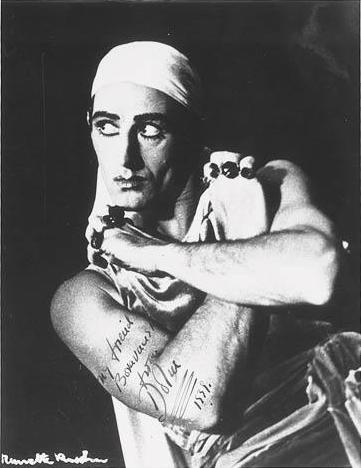
Dolin in 1939 staging of The Prodigal Son.

Popular passion for sport caused Cocteau to first conceive of a 'beach ballet'. The work also provided a prize role for the athletic Anton Dolin, whose "acrobatics astonished and delighted the audience." When he left the company, however, no one as capable could be found for the role, causing the ballet to be dropped.

Probably the ballet suffered when collaboration between Nijinska and librettist Cocteau collapsed. Garafola writes that contested issues included: (a) gender, Cocteau was said to entertain a "dim view of women" versus Nijinska's unease with traditional femininity; (b) Cocteau's story and gesture approach verses 'abstract ballet' (Cocteau favored substituting out dance for pantomime, but Nijinska was satisfied with a plotless ballet); and, (c) the changing aesthetics of dance (Cocteau's wholesale preference for acrobatics over dance, but which for Nijinska constituted a series of delicate judgments). Last minute changes were made. Nijinska's choreography managed to present for the audience a sophisticated view of the beach ballet. Garafola suggests that here "Only Nijinska had the technical wherewithal ... to wrest irony from the language and traditions of [classical dance]."

Le train bleu anticipated the 1933 ballet Beach. "Massine's choreography, like Nijinska's, was a stylization of sport motifs and different dance idioms within a structured balletic framework." The athletic dance scenes in both incorporated jazz movements. A half-century later, Nijinska's 1924 choreography was reconstructed and revived.

== Late 1920s & 1930s ==
=== 'Théâtre Chorégraphiques Nijinska', England and Paris 1925 ===
==== Leaving Diaghilev, start of her dance company ====
January 1925 marked Nijinska's departure from Ballets Russes. In part she left because of the grief she experienced when in the end Diaghilev had sided with Cocteau over Le Train Bleu. She wanted to lead her own company. Another reason was the 1924 arrival of the dynamic George Balanchine (1904-1983), with an experimental dance troupe from the Soviet Union. Diaghilev recognized his demonstrated talent and recruited him for Ballets Russes. Balanchine filled the choreographer position vacated by Nijinska.

In 1925 Nijinska found sufficient financing to form her ballet company: Théâtre Chorégraphiques Nijinska. It was a chamber ensemble that employed eleven dancers. The Russian avant-garde visual artist Alexandra Exter designed the costumes and sets. Nijinska had first met Exter in Kiev during war and revolution. It was a professional relationship that had continued as Nijinska choreographed for Ballets Russes. Nancy Van Doren Baer highly praised their collaboration, "a most dramatic synthesis of the visual and the kinetic".

For her company, Nijinska choreographed six short ballets, and danced in five. She also staged four divertissements, dancing one solo. For the 1925 summer season (August–October), her ballet company toured fifteen English resort towns and provincial cities. It then performed selections in Paris, at an international exhibition and for a gala program. "Judged by any standard, the Théâtre Chorégraphiques offered dancing, choreography, music, and costume design of the highest order."

==== Holy Etudes, an abstract ballet [Bach] ====
J. S. Bach's seal: J S B on the left, mirror image right, crown design above

Her first abstract ballet seen outside Russia, to J. S. Bach's First and Fifth Brandenburg Concertos, was also the first ballet mounted to his music. The dancers wore identical tunics and capes made of silk, with halo-like headgear. "Exter's 'uni-sex' costumes were revolutionary in their day." Yet, according to accounts, their simple and severe design "added immeasurably to the broad flowing movement and stately rhythms of the choreography, suggesting androgynous beings moving in heavenly harmony."

Silk "enhanced the ethereal quality of the ballet. The brilliant pink and bright orange capes hung straight from bamboo rods placed across the dancers' shoulders ... ." Baer further observes, "By varying the levels, groupings, and facings of the dancers, Nijinska created a pictorial composition made up of moving and intersecting planes of color." As in Les noces, Nijinska called for dancing en pointe "to elongate and stylize the line of the body".

Her short, abstract Bach ballet was one of those creations "she cared most about." She continued to rework its choreography, and presented it in varying forms and under different titles: for Teatro Colón in 1926; for Ballets Nijinska in 1931, which continued to be staged throughout the 1930s; and in 1940 at the Hollywood Bowl.

==== Five short modern pieces, four divertissements ====
i. Touring (or The Sports and Touring Ballet Revue).

Nijinska "took contemporary forms of locomotion as her theme", with music by Francis Poulenc, costumes and set by Exter. "Cycling, flying, horse-riding, carriage driving ... were all reduced to dancing." It further illustrated ballet's reach to modern life, following her brother Vaslav Nijinsky's Jeux of 1913, and her Les Biches and Le Train Bleu of 1924.

ii. Jazz.

The music was Igor Stravinsky's 1918 composition Ragtime. The composer writes it "was indicative of the passion I felt at that time for jazz ... enchanting me by its truly popular appeal, its freshness, and the novel rhythm ..." Exter's costumes followed an 1897 Russian performance of L'Africaine. In 1921 Exter had written about her fascination with "interrelationship, co-intensity, rhythmization, and the transition to color construction ..." Nininska's choreography, however, is lost. When children, she and her brother Vaslav had developed a friendship with two traveling African-American dance performers, house guests of their parents.

iii. On the Road. A Japanese pantomime.

Based on a Kabuki story, with music by Leighton Lucas, and costumes by Exter. Nancy Van Norman Baer conjectures that it developed from a solo called Fear designed and danced by Nijinsky in Kiev in 1919, and inspired by the dynamic movements of a Samurai warrior. In discussion, Nijinska mentions a Japanese influence on her early choreographic works, one source being a collection of prints purchased in 1911.

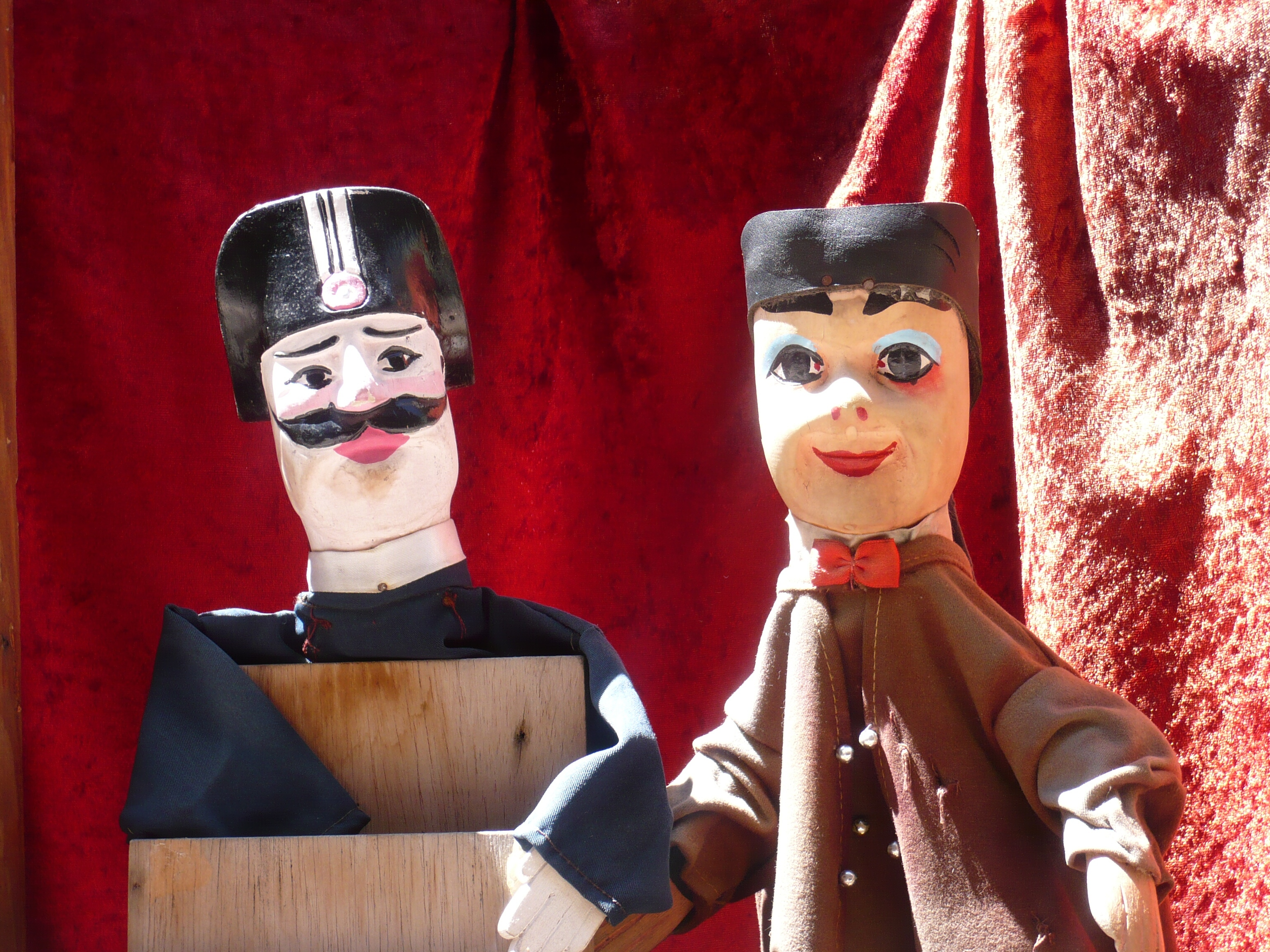
Guignol de Lyon

iv. Le Guignol

The title role is a character in a French puppet show, which became also a name for all puppet shows. Music by Joseph Lanner. It was later performed in 1926 at the Teatro Colón in Buenos Aires.

v. Night on Bald Mountain.

An abbreviated version of her 1924 work for Ballets Russes. "As in Holy Etudes and Les noces, Nijinska relied on the ensemble instead of using individual dancers to express the ballet-action."

Four divertissements.

The Musical Snuff Box was a restating of the solo La Poupée first danced by Nijinska in Kiev. Trepak was her The Three Ivans that she had choreographed for Diaghilev's The Sleeping Princess in London. The Mazurka to Chopin was from Les Sylphides. Polovetsian Dances was an ensemble for the entire company.

=== Companies and exemplary ballets 1926–1930 ===
During these years, for various ballet companies (including Diaghilev's in 1926) and for Teatro Colón in Argentina, Nijinska continued to choreograph and direct performances, and to dance.

==== 'Théâtre de l'Opéra' in Paris: Bien Aimée [or Beloved] ====
At the Paris Opera Nijinska choreographed the ballet La Rencontres [The Encounters], libretto by Kochno, music by Sauguet. At the circus, Oedipus meets the Sphinx. In 1927 she presented there another new ballet, Impressions de Music-Hall. She also choreographed dances for several operas.

Bien Aimée, a one-act ballet in 1928, was choreographed by Nijinska, music from Schubert and Liszt, libretto and decor by Benois. The dancers included Ida Rubinstein and Anatole Vilzak. Its thin plot features a poet at the piano who reminisces about his departed Muse, and his youth. The ballet was revived by the Markova-Dolan company in 1937. Ballet Theatre in New York City arranged for Nijinska to stage its American premier in 1941/1942.

==== Diaghilev's 'Ballets Russes' in Monte Carlo: Romeo and Juliet ====
A new version of Romeo and Juliet with music by Constant Lambert premiered in 1926. The ballet impressed Massine, who saw it later in London. "Nijinska's choreography was an admirable attempt to express the poignancy of Shakespeare's play in the most modern terms." At the end, the leading dancers Karsavina and Lifar, lovers in real life, "eloped in an aeroplane". Max Ernst did design work, Balanchine an entr'acte. "It seemed to me that this ballet was far in advance of its time," Massine later wrote.

==== 'Teatro Colón' in Buenos Aires: Estudio Religioso, choreographies for opera ====
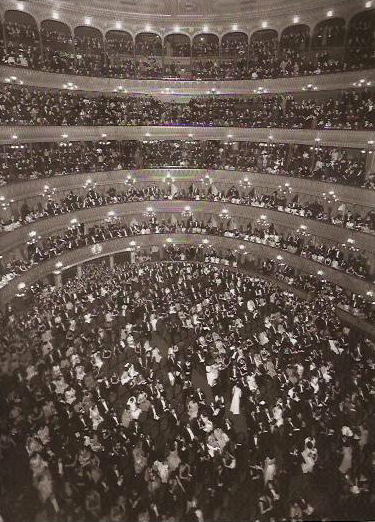
A 1935 gala premiere at Teatro Colón.

In 1926 Nijinska became choreographic director and principal dancer with Teatro Colón (Columbus Theater). Her active association with the Buenos Aires company would endure through 1946. Over a decade before, in 1913 the Ballets Russes had toured Buenos Aires, Montevideo, and Rio de Janeiro, but Nijinska then with child did not go. Nijinsky her brother did. In 1926 she found in Argentina "an inexperienced but enthusiastic group of dancers," thirty in number, in a ballet organization newly founded by Adolph Bolm.

Nijinska staged Un Estudio Religioso to music by Bach in 1926, which she developed from her choreography Holy Etudes of 1925. At Teatro Colón she was able to expand the work into a presentation by a full company. She drew on innovative ideas she'd first developed in Kiev during war and revolution. In both these Bach ballets, there was no libretto, no plot.

This abstract ballet, inspired by the spirituality of the music, was choreographed to an arrangement of the six Brandenburg Concertos and was the first ballet to be mounted to the music of J. S. Bach.

In 1926 and 1927 for the Buenos Aires theater, Nijinska created dance scenes for fifteen operas, including Bizet's Carmen, Wagner's Tannhäuser, Verdi's Aïda and La Traviata, Stravinsky's Le Rossignol, Rimsky-Korsakov's Tsar Saltan, Massenet's Thaïs, and Gounod's Faust. In 1927 for Teatro Colón, Nijinska directed ballet choreography created by Fokine for Ballets Russes: Ravel's Daphnis et Chloë, and Stravinsky's Petrouchka.

==== 'Ida Rubinstein Ballet' in Paris: Boléro, La Valse, Le Baiser de la Fée ====
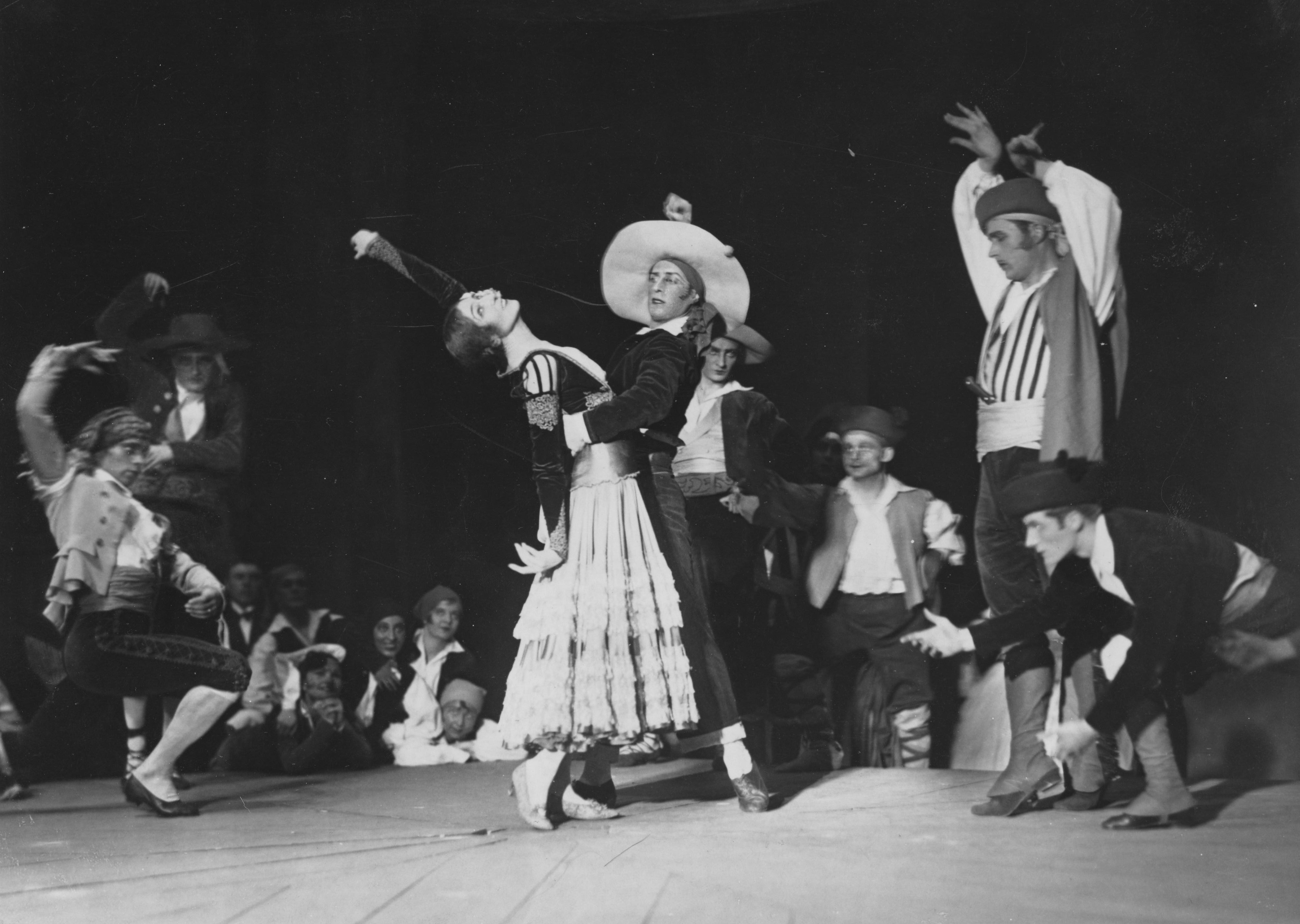
Ida Rubenstein in Nijinska's Boléro

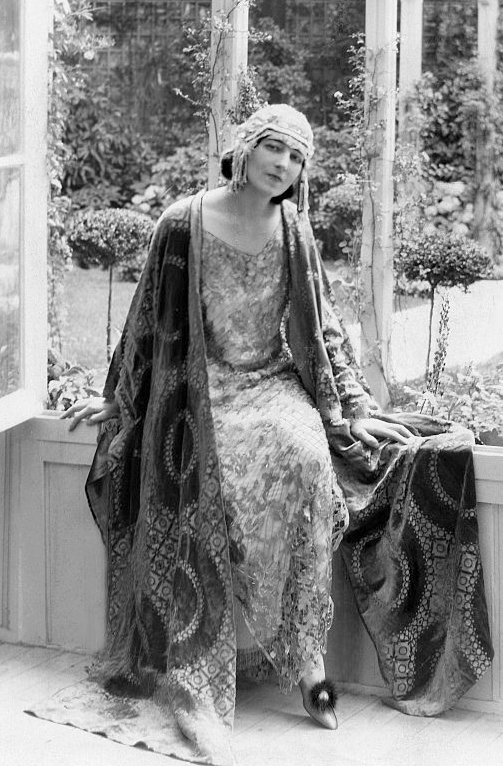
Rubinstein in 1922

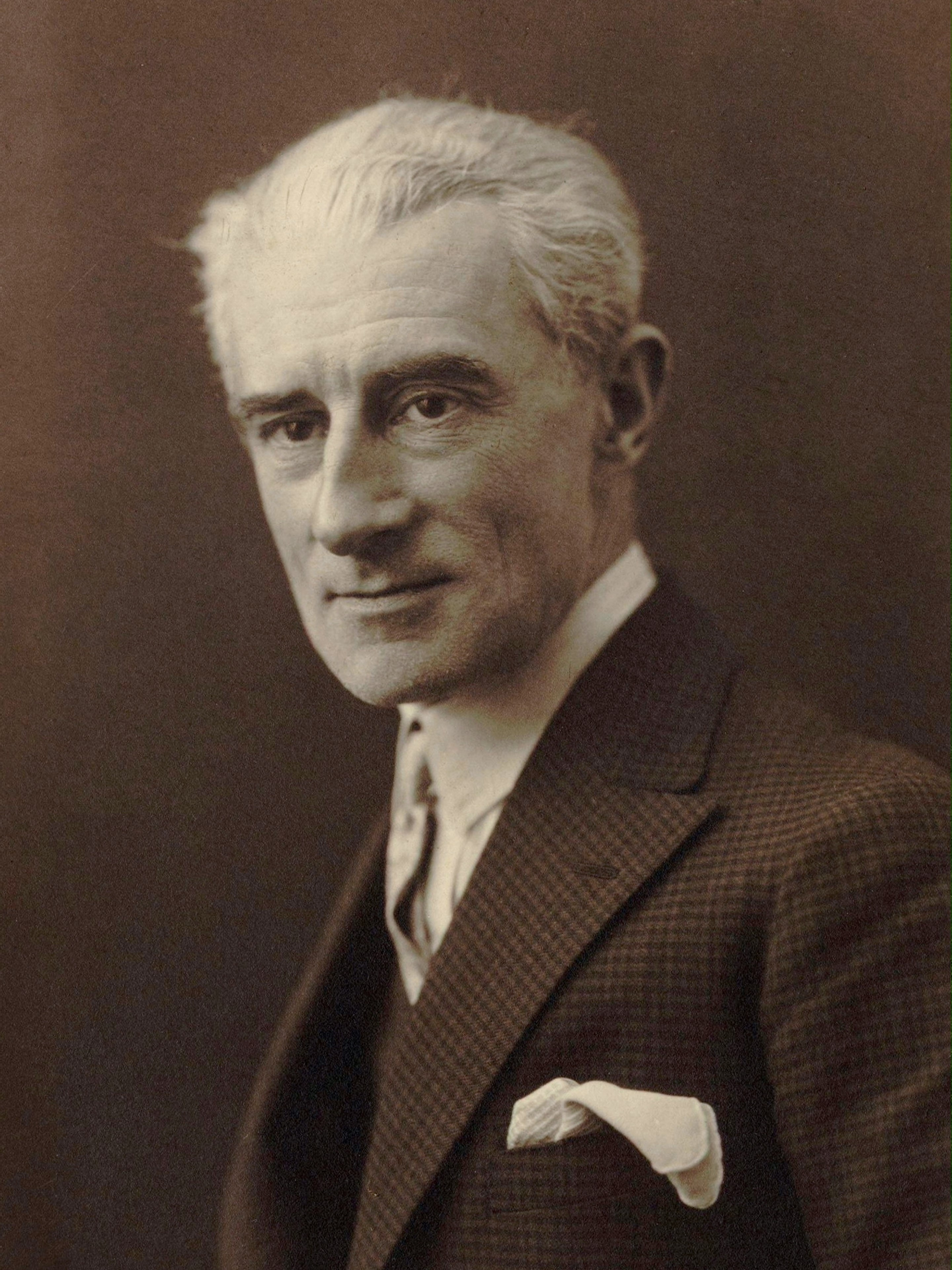
Ravel in 1925

The dancer Ida Rubinstein formed a ballet company in 1928, with Bronislava Nijinska named as its choreographer. Rubinstein quickly arranged for Maurice Ravel to compose music for her new dance enterprise. By luck or genius, one of Ravel's pieces became popular immediately and famous. It has remained so to this day: his Boléro.

For Rubinstein, Nijinska choreographed the original Boléro ballet. In it she created an ambient scene around a large circular platform, surrounded by various individual dancers, who by turns hold the gaze. At times to the side several begin to dance and draw notice. Yet the ballet-action always returns to the center. Dramatic movements inspired by Spanish dance are yet abbreviated, understated, stylized.

Rubinstein herself had danced for Diaghilev in the early years of his company Ballets Russes. In the 1910 ballet Scheherazade she and Vaslav Nijinsky (Nijinska's brother) both had leading roles. They danced together in a scene Nijinska called "breathtaking". Rubinstein and Nijinsky also had partnered in the ballet Cléopâtre a year before in Paris for Ballets Russes. Rubinstein played the title role. The ballet was "the runaway success of the 1909 season that made her an overnight star".

Following Bolero Rubinstein directed her company to prepare another ballet choreographed by Nijinska, with music by Ravel: his La valse. It opened in Monte Carlo in 1929, décor by Benois, featuring as dancers Rubinstein and Vilzak. The ballet was often revived, most famously in 1951 by Balanchine.

A ballet of Le Baiser de la Fée [Kiss of the Fairy] originated when Ida Rubinstein asked Igor Stravinsky to compose music to be choreographed by Bronislava Nijinska. It would be staged in Paris in 1928. "The idea was that I should compose something inspired by the music of Tchaikovsky," wrote Stravinsky. For a theme he chose Hans Christian Andersen's 'eerie' tale of The Ice-Maiden, but he changed the story with his positive spin: "A fairy imprints her magic kiss on a [male] child at birth ... Twenty years later ... she repeats the fatal kiss and carries him off to live in supreme happiness with her ..." Stravinsky understood the fairy to be Tchaikovsky's Muse whose kiss branded him with a 'magic imprint' to inspire his music.

The composer Stravinsky conducted the orchestra for the ballet's first performance at the Opéra in Paris in 1928. The dancers included Rubinstein, Ludmila Schollar, and Vilzak. Le Baiser de la Fée played at other European capitals, and in 1933 and 1936/1937 at the Colón Theatre in Buenos Aires. In 1935 Ashton choreographed a new version that played in London, and in 1937 Balanchine did so for a version that played in New York.

==== 'Opéra Russe à Paris': Capriccio Espagnol [Rimsky-Korsakov] ====
This ballet company 'Opéra Russe à Paris' was founded in 1925 by a Russian singer and her husband, a nephew of French composer Massenet. A company director and major figure was Wassily de Basil (the former Vassily Voskresensky, a Russian entrepreneur, and perhaps once a Cossack officer). Since Sergei Diaghilev's death in 1929, followed by the collapse of his 'Ballets Russes', a discomforting void inhabited the world of European ballet.

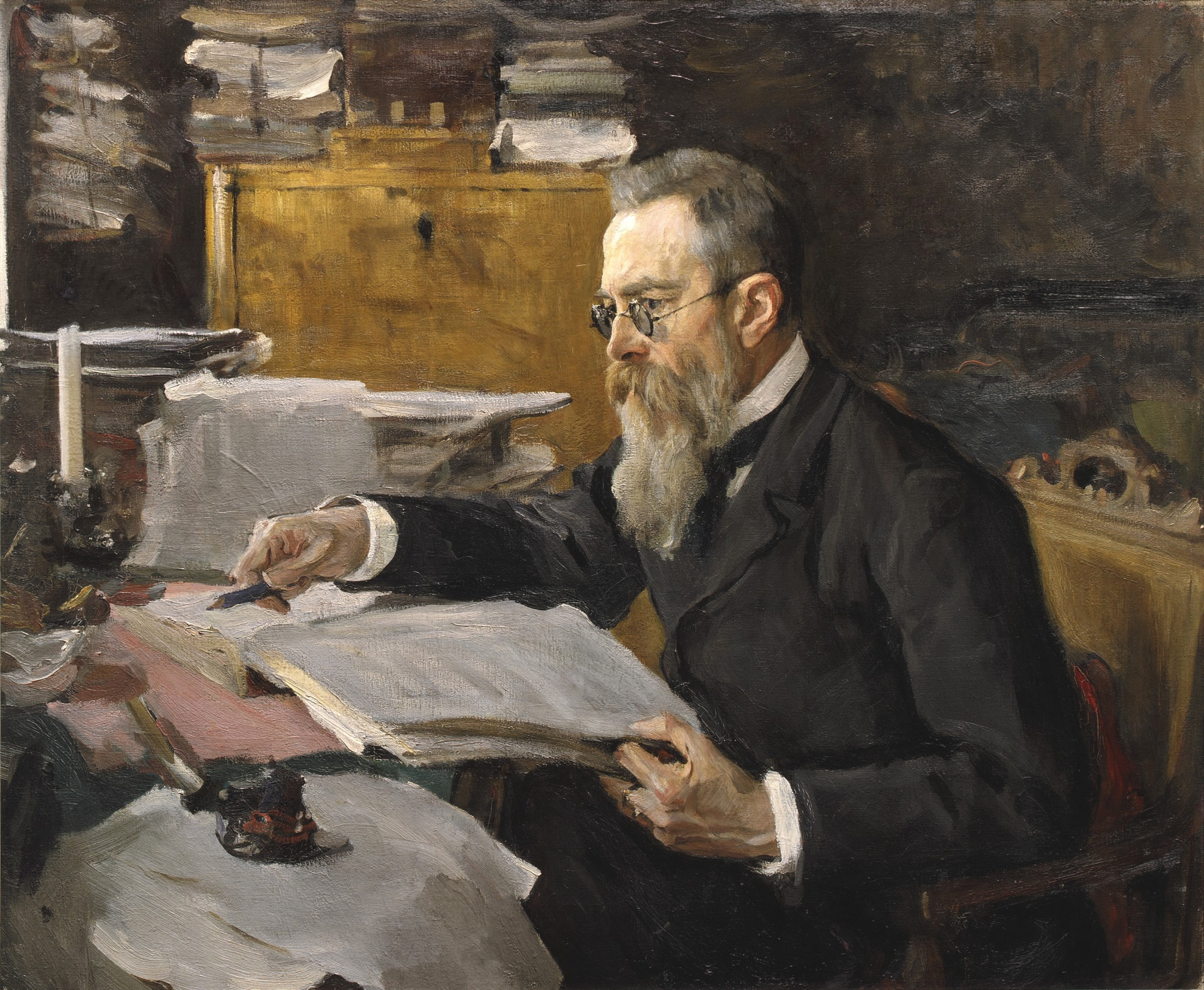
Rimsky-Korsakov's portrait by Simeon 1891

Nijinska in 1930 joined 'Opèra Russe à Paris' run by de Basil. She was "to choreograph the ballet sequences" in several well-known operas. She was also "to create works for the all-ballet evenings that alternated with evenings of opera." Consequently, she created the ballet for Capriccio Espagnol by Russian composer Nikolai Rimsky-Korsakov. She also staged several of her previous ballet creations (Les noces and Les Biches) and other Ballets Russes fare of the Diaghilev era.

In 1931 she turned down an "unusually generous" offer from de Basil in order to start the company, 'Ballets Nijinska'. She wanted to pursue projects independently, although she maintained her former working situation for a time longer. Latter in 1934 and 1935 she would again work with de Basil's company.

René Blum (brother of the French politician Léon Blum) was then "organizing the ballet seasons at the Casino de Monte Carlo." In 1931 he began talks with de Basil about combining ballet operations, hence the naissant company 'Ballets Russes de Monte Carlo'. From de Basil would come "dancers, repertory, scenery, and costumes" and from Blum "the theater and its facilities and financial support". A contract was signed in January 1932. "From the beginning de Basil acted as impresario." Soon, however, Blum and de Basil fell out and in 1936 split, each forming his own company. Later in the 1940s Nijinska staged works for a successor to Blum's half, then run by Sergei Denham.

=== Her dance companies 1931–1932, 1932–1934 ===
During the early thirties, Nijinska formed and directed several ballet companies of her own. In 1934 misfortune came: a mistaken seizure of essential theatrical gear. This setback forced cancelation of her company's autumn performance schedule. It led her to accept an offer to choreograph 'free lance', and then resume working for other companies.

==== 'Ballets Nijinska' in Paris: Etude-Bach, choreographies for Opéra-Comique ====
In 1931, although continuing to stage dance productions for 'Opera Russe à Paris' (see above), Nijinska began operating independently under her own name: 'Ballets Nijinska'. Here she choreographed ballet pieces for operas performed at the Opéra-Comique of Paris, and at the Théâtre des Champs-Elysées, where under auspices of the 'Opera Russe' her 'Ballets Nijinska' operated autonomously.

In 1931 her company staged Etude-Bach with Boris Belinsky's decor and costumes, after Alexandra Exter. This was a new version of her 1925 Holy Etudes and her 1926 Un Estudio Religioso.

==== 'Théâtre de la Danse Nijinska' in Paris: Variations [Beethoven], Hamlet [Liszt] ====
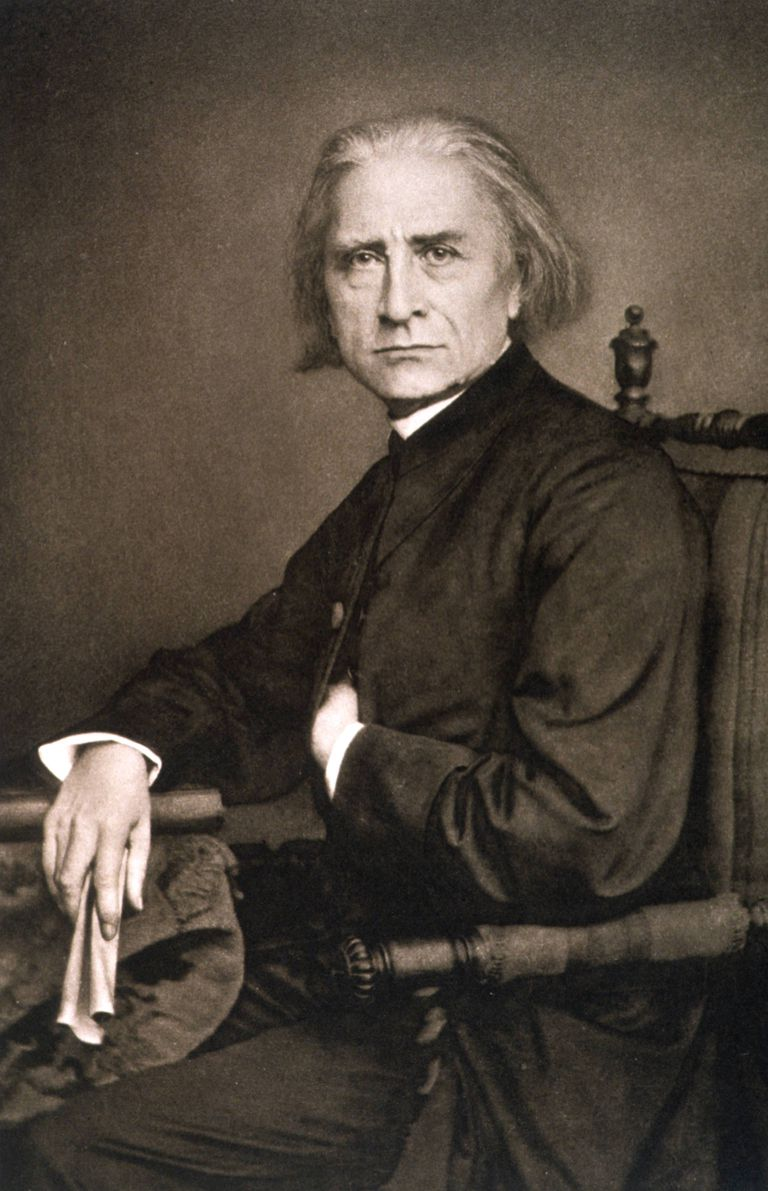
Franz Liszt, photo by Hanfstaengl, 1867

From 1932 to 1934 Nijinska directed her Paris-based company, 'Théâtre de la Danse Nijinska'. A new ballet Variations was staged in 1932, inspired by Beethoven (a selection of his compositions). The dancers followed a difficult theme: the flux in the fate of nations (classical Greece, Russia under Alexander I, France during the early Second Empire). Choreographed primarily as ensemble dances and pantomime, the costumes and decor were by Georges Annenkov.

In 1934 she designed a ballet Hamlet, based on Shakespeare's play, performed to music by Hungarian composer Franz Liszt. Nijinska played the title role. "Her choreography, however, instead of retelling Shakespeare's plot, emphasized the feelings of the tragedy's tormented characters." Nijinska conceived "three aspects for each of the protagonists". In addition to "the real character" there were "characters representing his soul and his fate" played "by separate groups of dancers" like "a Greek chorus". A similar Hamlet ballet was later staged in London.

There were performances of two of her remarkable ballets from the mid-1920s, Les Biches in 1932, and in 1933 Les noces. Nijinska's Théâtre de la Danse enjoyed ballet seasons in Paris and Barcelona, and toured France and Italy. The company's 1934 season at the Théâtre du Châtelet featured the ballets Etude-Bach, La Princesse Cygne, Les Biches, Bolero, Les Comediens Jaloux, and Le Baiser de la Fée.

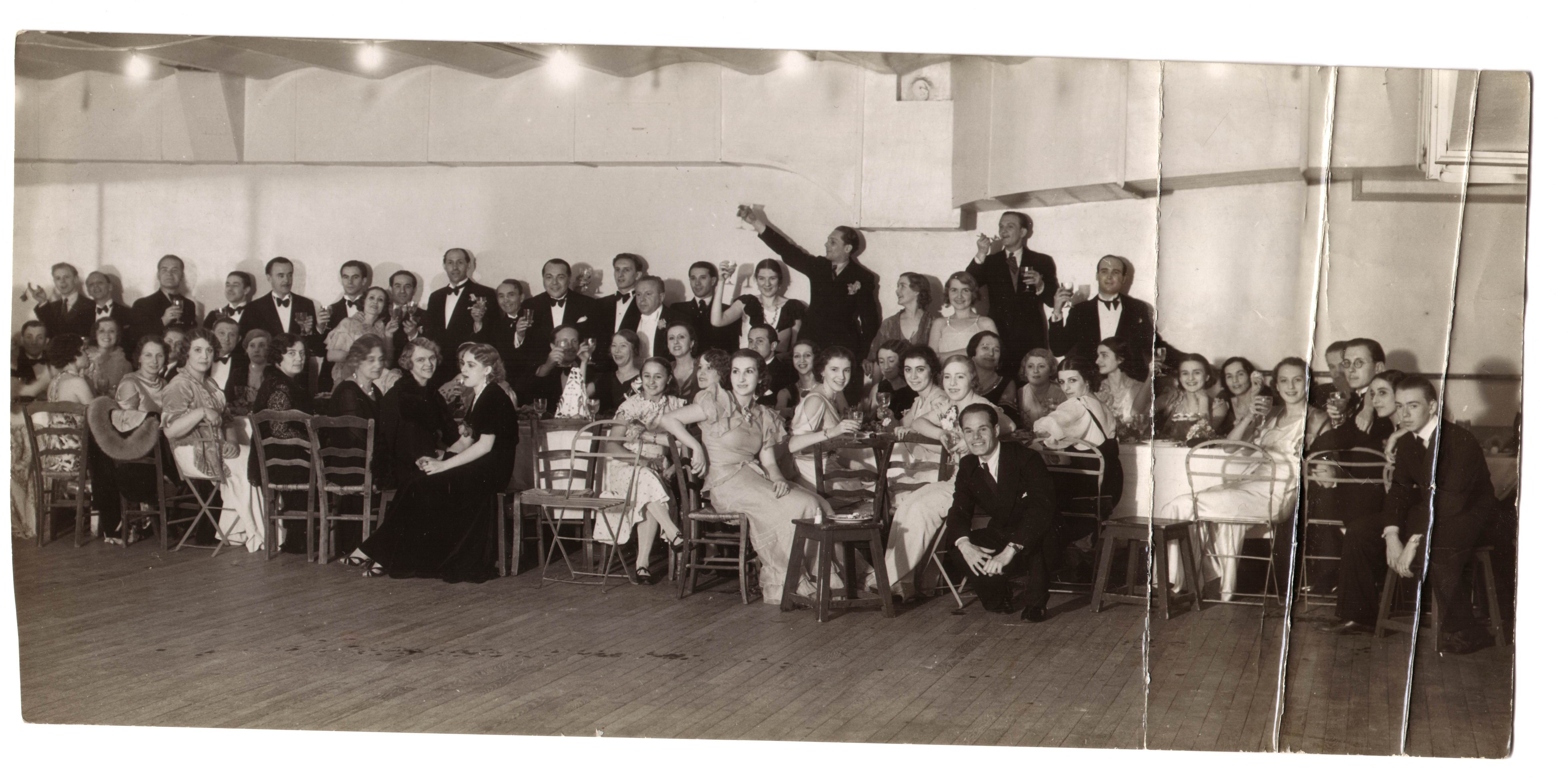
Bronislava Nijinska and René Blum with the Ballets Russes in Monte Carlo, April 1934

In 1934 Nijinska joined her dance company to Wassily de Basil's company Ballet Russe de Monte Carlo. For the 1934 Opera and Ballet seasons, she directed the Monte Carlo productions of the combined companies in performances of her repertoire.

Later in 1934 'Théâtre de la Danse Nijinska' lost its costumes and sets when they were mistakenly seized, for the benefit of unpaid artists of another company, the 'Opera Russe à Paris'. Although blameless, not until 1937 was Nijinska able to recover them.

Thus she was "forced to cancel all Théâtre de la Danse engagements" scheduled for its autumn tour of France and England. Her dancers then began to accept other work. Nijinska herself was offered a choreographing contract by a film producer, and so left Paris for Hollywood.

=== Companies and ballets 1935–1938 ===
==== Max Reinhardt's Hollywood film: A Midsummer Night's Dream ====
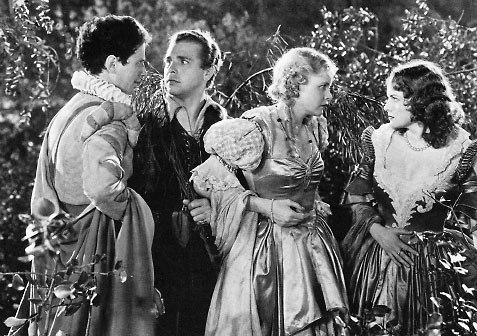
Cast of Midsummer Night's Dream: Ross Alexander, Dick Powell, Jean Muir and Olivia de Havilland.

In 1934 Max Reinhardt requested Nijinska to travel to Los Angeles and choreograph the dance scenes for his 1935 film A Midsummer Night's Dream. It was a Hollywood recreation of the William Shakespeare comedy, with music by Felix Mendelssohn. Much of the music was taken from his two compositions about this Shakespeare play. The first was Mendelssohn's 1826 concert overture, the second his 1842 incidental music, which incorporated the overture. Apparently Los Angeles agreed with Nijinska, for a few years later she would make it her permanent residence. In 1934 she designed the dances.

Nijinska's incidental choreography for A Midsummer Night's Dream (1935) was as imaginative and magical as everything else in that sumptuously produced film."

As a one-act ballet in Saint Petersburg A Midsummer Night's Dream had been "first choreographed by Marius Petipa in 1876" and in 1902 by Mikhail Fokine, to Mendelssohn's 1842 music. Other versions were later staged by Terpis (Berlin 1927), Balanchine (New York 1962), Ashton (London 1964), and Spoerli (Basle 1975). A staging of Fokine's choreography, however, at the Imperial Theatrical School on March 26, 1906, was especially memorable for Nijinska. Not only did she dance in it, but the date marked a visit by her father after a long absence.

The 1935 film was not Nijinska's first time in the employ of Max Reinhardt. The well-known impresario's practice was to stage a variety of performance arts in theaters across Europe. In 1931, for a Reinhardt production in Berlin, Nijinska had created the ballet scenes for Offenbach's opera The Tales of Hoffmann.

==== de Basil's 'Ballets Russes de Monte Carlo': Les Cent Baisers ====
Nijinska choreographed Les Cent Baisers [The hundred kisses] in 1935 for de Basil's company. This one-act ballet was set to music by Anglo-French composer Frédéric Alfred d'Erlanger. It opened in London at Covent Garden.

The libretto by Boris Kochno followed the literary fairy tale "The swineherd and the princess" created by Hans Christian Andersen. Here a disguised prince woos an arrogant princess. Nijinska's choreography is considered one of her more classical. Yet she incorporated subtle variations from the usual academic steps, according to Irina Baronova who danced the role of the princess. It gave the piece a special feeling of the East. The prince was played by David Lichine.

==== Teatro Colón in Buenos Aires: Le Baiser de la Fée, Opera choreographies ====
Nijinska had presented at Teatro Colón in 1933 her ballet Le Baiser de la Fée [Kiss of the fairy], which she had first staged for Ida Rubinstein's Company in 1928. It was based on Hans Christian Andersen's 1861 fairy tale "The Ice-Maiden". Yet, in recreating the tale, music composer Igor Stravinsky had changed the eerie maiden into a fruitful Muse, inverting Andersen's original story in which the ice-maiden, disguised as a beautiful woman, attracts young men who are led to their death.

In 1937 Nijinska returned to Buenos Aires for a reprise performance of Le Baiser de la Fée at the Stravinsky Festival. Ballet choreography she also created for dance scenes in operatic works that played at Teatro Colón. Accordingly, Nijinska worked with the music of various composers, e.g., Mussorgsky, Verdi, de Falla, and Wagner.

==== 'Markova-Dolin Ballet' in London and Jamaica; (Markova later: Autumn Song) ====
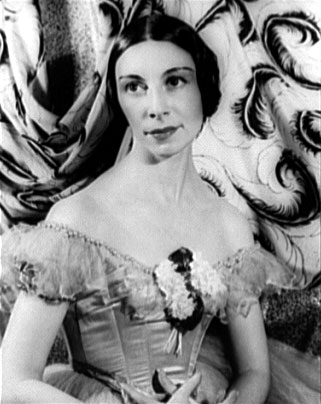
Dame Alicia Markova

In 1937 Nijinska reprised her 1924 Les Biches for a performance by the Markova-Dolin troupe. "For six months during 1937 the troupe was creatively bolstered by the presence of Nijinska, who took charge of rehearsals and classes in addition to staging Les Biches and La Bien-Aimée."

Alicia Markova was a leading ballerina of London. In 1935 she left the Vic-Wells ballet company of Ninette de Valois, where she had excelled in classical roles. She left to "form the Markova-Dolin Company (1935–1938), with Bronislava Nijinsky as chief choreographer." Irish dancer Anton Dolin had worked with Ballets Russes starting in 1921. Later he was the 'handsome swimmer' in Nijinska's 1924 Le Train Bleu. During the 1930s he became a frequent dance partner of Markova. He joined American Ballet Theatre in 1940.

After the war, for the Markova-Dolin company Nijinska choreographed Fantasia, music by Schubert and Liszt. A one-act ballet it opened in 1947 at the Ward Theatre, Kingston, Jamaica. Costumes and decor were by Rose Schogel, principal dancers: Bettina Rosay and Anton Dolin.

In the 1930s Nijinska gave Alicia Markova 'creative sessions' in ballet, including instructions for her own choreographies. In particular she taught Markova an early work of hers from Kiev: Autumn Song to music by Tchaikovsky. Nijinska had originally danced it barefoot wearing a tunic of her own design. In 1953 Markova performed this solo ballet for a variety show on NBC television.

==== 'Ballet Polonais' in Warsaw: Concerto de Chopin, La Légende de Cracovie ====
In 1937 Nijinska was asked to become the artistic director and the choreographer for the newly recreated Balet Polski (aka Les Ballets Polonais, or The Polish Ballet). In the revival of this national ballet, among its chief aims: to advance the Polish dance heritage, to train new ballet professionals, and to perform internationally. She signed a 3-year contract. For the company's 1937-1938 debut season, she created five new ballets: Le Chant de la Terre, Apollon et la Belle, Le Rappel, Concerto de Chopin, and La Légende de Cracovie.

For the Exposition Internationale in Paris, the five opened at the Théâtre de Mogador in November 1937. Well received, the Exposition awarded Ballet Polonais the Grand Prix for performance and Nijinska the Grand Prix for choreography. The ballet company then continued on to perform their prize-winning program chiefly in London, Berlin, and Warsaw, also touring other cities in Germany and in Poland.

For Le Chant de la Terre (Pieśń o ziemi naszej) [Song of the Earth], Nijinska drew in part on a recent folk festival in Vilna featuring dance. She also took inspiration from the drawings of Polish artist Zofja Stryjenska.

"The first scene, 'Little Saturday,' depicted the spring rituals of sun and fire worship...The customs of the Slavic wedding were represented in the second scene when the celebrants danced 'wild Mazurkas and [steps] of the vital earth-stamping kind with complicated rhythms and...leaps in the air.'...The final scene, 'Harvest,' had powerful choreographic images of the ceremonies surrounding the season's harvest." In this powerful climax "a wedge of dancers, wielding curved scythes in great arcing movements, carved their way diagonally across the stage."

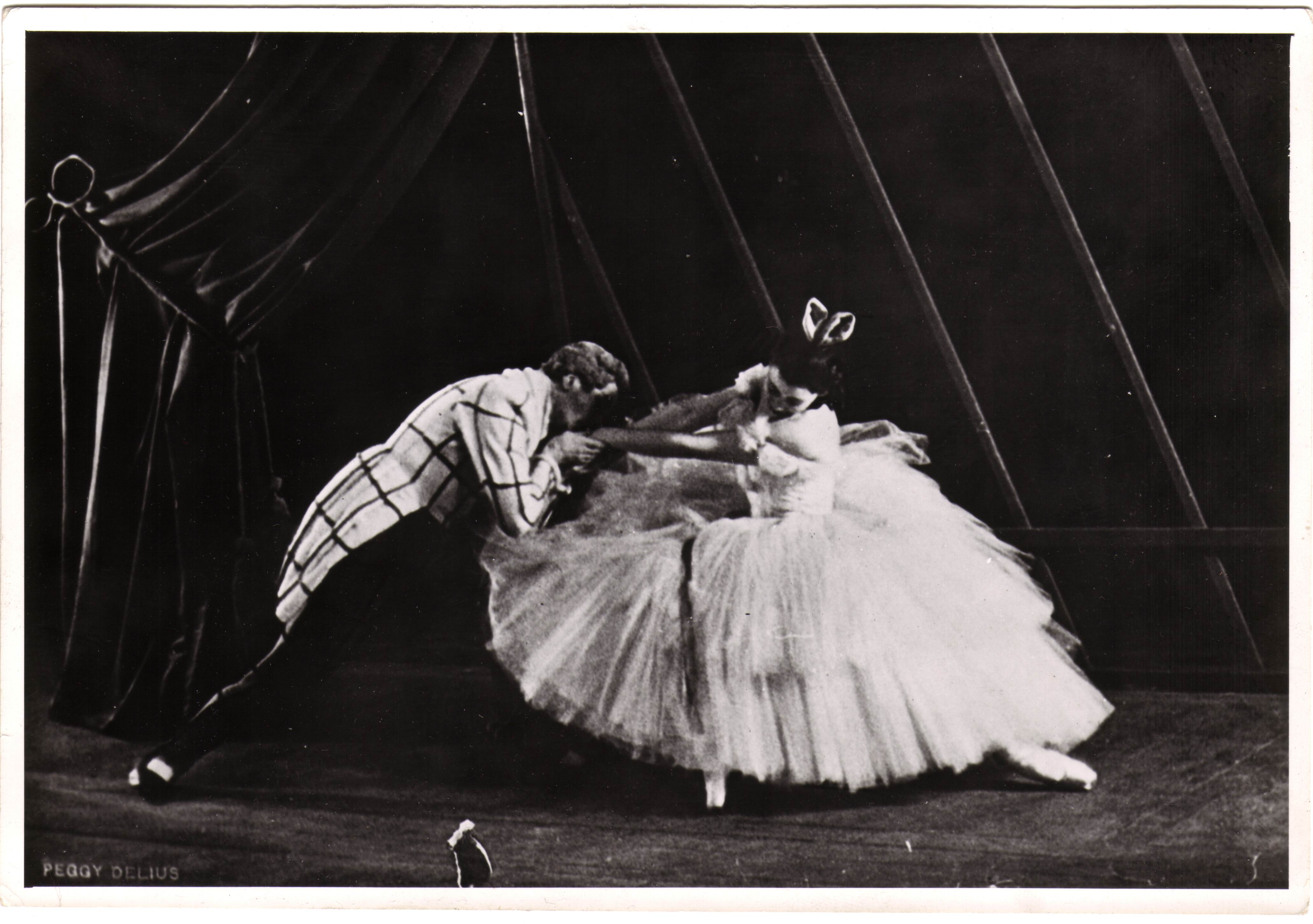
Balet Polski: Kari Karnakovski and Nina Youshkevitch in Apollon et la Belle

Regarding her ballet Apollon et la Belle (Apolo i dziewczyna):

"Nijinska ingeniously traced the incarnation of Apollo through five epochs of civilization. In each age, Nijinska's Apollo encounters his counterpart, the Dionysian earth element, in the form of a woman." "Program notes describe the incarnations of Apollo ranging from god of ancient Greece to athlete on a modern beach. In the first scene, Apollo is the celestial charioteer who must descend to earth to receive strength and purpose from the earth-mother feminine character. In successive scenes of inventive and sometimes humorous incarnations Apollo reappears in the guise of a medieval monk, Louis the XIV, a nineteenth-century poet, and finally as a modern-day champion of athleticism."

Le Rappel (Wezwanie) [The recall] "begins in a Viennese ballroom of the eighteenth century, where a denationalized young Pole is enjoying the sophisticated society in which he finds himself. Yet the young woman whom he catches in a game of blind man's buff is Polish. She recalls for him the simpler manners and the more demonstrative dances of their native countryside. ... A large corps de ballet supports the principals in producing the contrast of the two types of dance, the Viennese and the Polish."

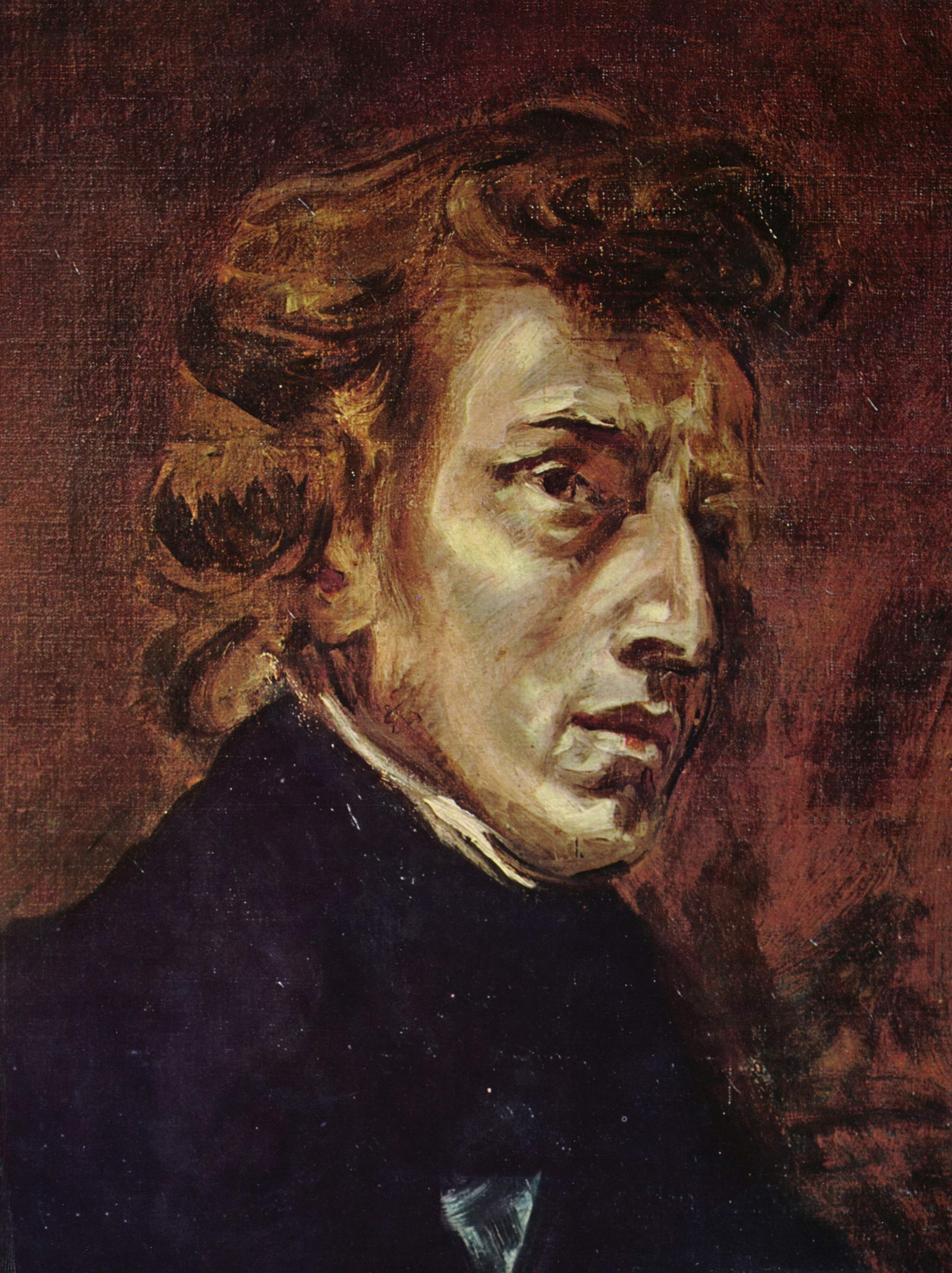
Chopin at 28 -Delacroix

The Concerto de Chopin "follows no plot but tries to reflect the shifting moods of the music." Baer suggests that the ballet shows Nijinska's "feeling of longing, farewell, and sorrow that she had experienced on leaving Russia" in 1921. About the Chopin Concerto (as later performed in 1944), dance critic Edward Denby wrote of it as "oddly beautiful ... because it is clear and classic to the eye but tense and romantic in its emotion."

The structure of the piece—like that of much of Mme Nijinska's work—is based on a formal contrast: in the background, rigid impersonal groups or clusters of dancers, which seem to have the weight of statues; in the foreground, rapid arrowy flights performed by individual soloists. One appreciates their flashes of lightness and freedom because of the weight they seem to rise over, as if the constraints of the group were the springboard for the soloist's release.

Nijinska also staged La Légend de Cracovie, "a new ballet of high merit" to music by Michal Kondracki. In plot it is "a medieval Polish variation of the Faust story". In choreography she employed her "celebrated group architecture" but also fashioned roles open to character dance development. As described by French critic Pierre Michaut, "Les héros et ses compagnons composaient leurs danses avec des éléments de folklore et avec des danses traditionelles polonaises, telles que la Cracovienne. Mais pas et figures étaient déformés, outrés, fortement accentués en burlesque, et ils devenaient une sorte de gesticulation frénétique et d'ailleurs expressive."

After Balet Polski's 1937-1938 tour, which started with the Grand Prix performances in Paris, Nijinska was "abruptly released" from her leadership position. The cause of her dismissal, most likely according to Baer, was "her insistence upon a full disclosure of the troupe's financial records." Due to the increasing danger of military attack by neighboring countries, the Polish government apparently was seeking to covertly route some of its funds to America. "Characteristically, Nijinska would have refused to become involved with politics or intrigue." She was replaced by Léon Wójcikowski.

With Ballets Russes since 1916 Leon Wójcikowski (1899-1975) had enjoyed prominent roles in Nijinska's Les noces, Les Biches, and Le Train Bleu (as the Golfer). In 1939 he led the Ballet Polonais to the World's Fair in New York. "The company returned to Warsaw one day before the German invasion of Poland on September 1, 1939, and was never heard from again." Wójcikowski himself found work in the Americas during the war. Much later he helped in reconstructing Nijinska's 1920s choreographies at Diaghilev's Ballets Russes.

Yet for Nijinska then in 1938, in pre-invasion Poland, the going became more difficult. The "shock of her dismissal" and "the impending war caused a profound depression."

== To America, & Revivals ==
=== Ballet companies and exemplary ballets 1939–1950s ===
Nijinska and her family were in London when World War II started with the combined Nazi and Soviet invasion of Poland (September 1939). She had a contract to "co-direct the dance sequences on a new film, Bullet in the Ballet," but it was cancelled due to war. Fortunately, an offer from promoter de Basil allowed them to make their way back to the United States. She eventually established a new residence in Los Angeles.

==== 'Ballet Theatre' in New York: La Fille Mal Gardée of Dauberval ====
Nijinska in 1939 began to choreograph a "rustic and comic" two-act ballet of the 18th century, Jean Dauberval's La fille mal gardée ['The ill-watched Daughter' or 'Useless Precautions']. For the inaugural season of Ballet Theatre (now ABT), it opened in January 1940 in New York City at the old Center Theatre in Rockefeller Plaza.

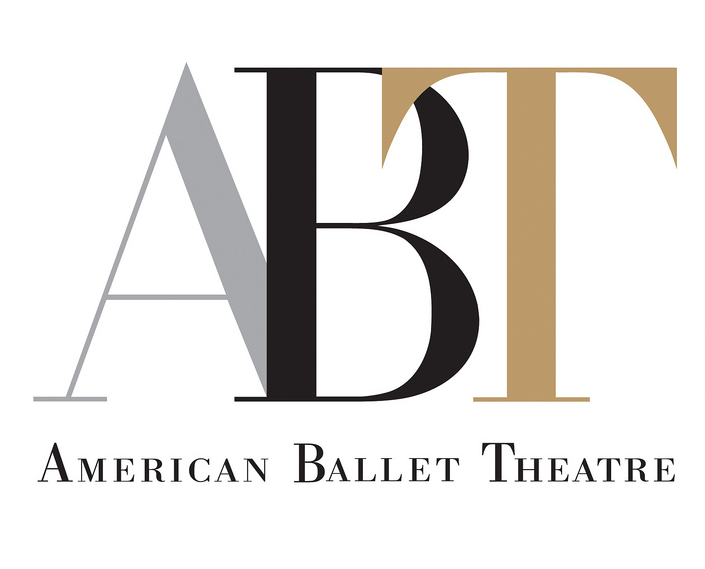
Ballet Theatre, renamed in 1956.

La Fille Mal Gardée is perhaps "the oldest ballet in the contemporary repertory" whose "comic situations are no doubt responsible for its survival." Jean Dauberval wrote the libretto and first choreography, the original music being a mix of popular French songs. Premiering at Grand Théâtre de Bordeaux in 1789, the comedy "quickly made the circuit of European stages." Later in 1864 Taglioni's production in Berlin first adopted composite music scored by Hertel, which in 1885 was adopted by Petipa and Ivanov for the Maryinski Theater in Saint Petersburg.

Dauberval's plot follows a lively rural romance, the lovers being "the mind-of-her-own Lise and the hard-to-resist Colas". They are challenged by Lise's mother the widow Simone, who prefers Allain, a wealthy but dull suitor.

"In America the most important production was Nijinska's for Ballet Theatre in 1940." Lucia Chase had invited her to mount her own version, which incorporated decor from Mordkin (his company had merged with Ballet Theatre). Nijinska took to revising Petipa's Russian version of La Fille Mal Gardée and staged the ballet with Irina Baronova and Dimitri Romanoff. This 1940 staging was soon revived, once as The Wayward Daughter, with later versions by Romanoff, and in 1946 by Alexandra Balashova. Eventually it entered the repertory of the Grand Ballet du Marquis de Cuevas.

Twenty years later in London, Nijinska's former student Frederick Ashton of The Royal Ballet staged it. He refashioned the Dauberval libretto, wrote his choreography to Hertel's music as modified by Lanchbery, and provided a revised decor. The result was a popular, and declared a "substantial work".

Also for Ballet Theatre, in 1951 Nijinska choreographed and staged the Schumann Concerto, music by Robert Schumann, with Alicia Alonso and Igor Youskevitch as principal dancers. The music's romantic mood frames the abstract ballet in three movements. The couple is joined by a corps de ballet of boys and girls. In 1945 Nijinska had choreographed Rendezvous with music by Sergei Rachmaninoff (1873-1943), with principal dancers Lucia Chase and Dimitri Romanoff. Both were staged for Ballet Theatre at the Metropolitan Opera House in New York City.

==== 'Hollywood Bowl': Boléro, Chopin Concerto, Etude-Bach; and Jacob's Pillow ====
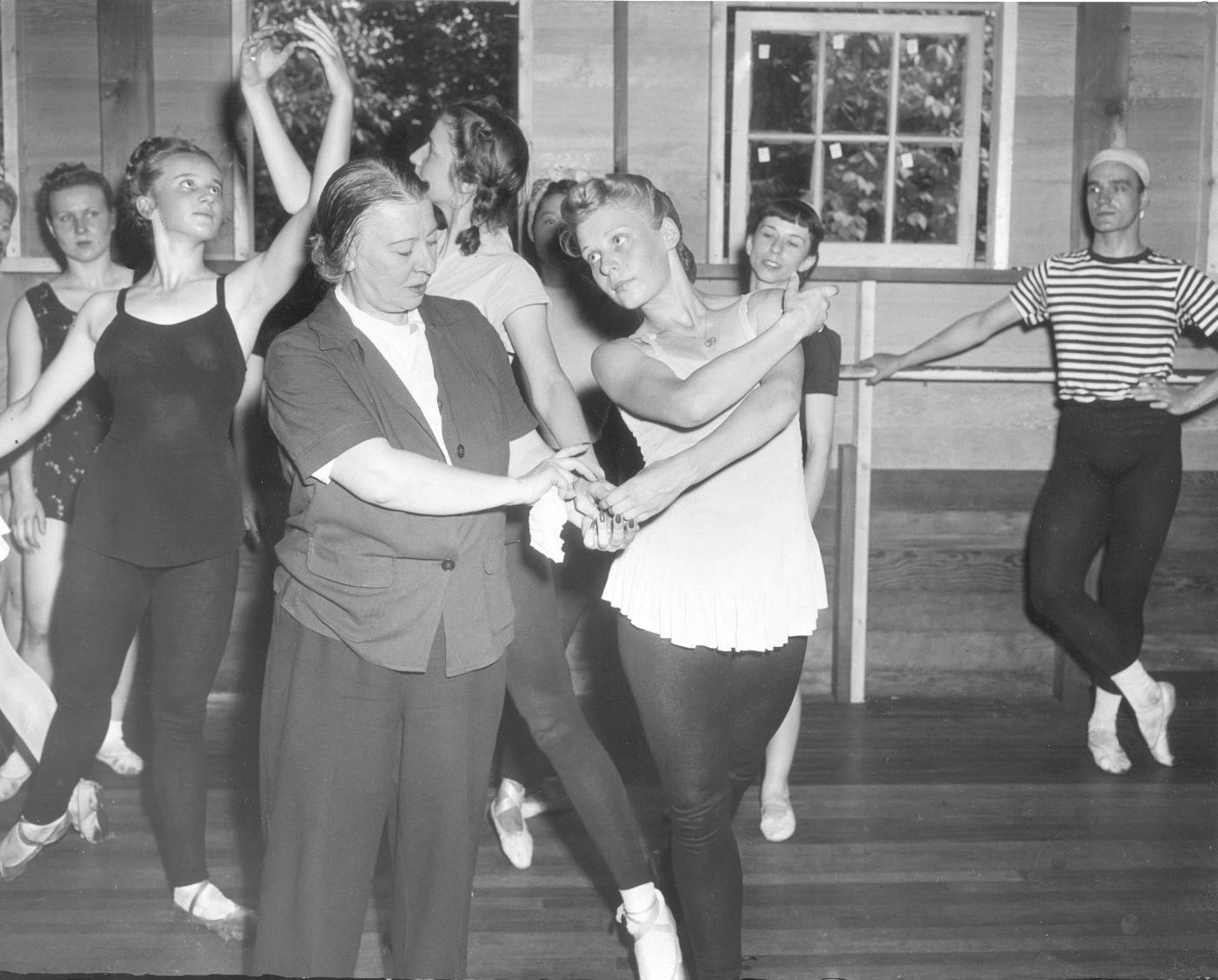
Bronislava Nijinska works with Ann Hutchinson at Jacob's Pillow in 1942

Later in 1940 she staged three short ballets for a performance at the Hollywood Bowl. For the program with the Los Angeles Philharmonic Orchestra she selected favorites from among her prior choreographies: Ravel's Boléro (premiered with Rubinstein in 1932, revised), the Chopin Concerto (from 1937 with the Polish Ballet), and Etude-Bach (originally 'Holy Etudes' done for her own company in 1925, revisions). The event drew an audience of 22,000, and featured dancers Maria Tallchief and Cyd Charisse.

Nijinska revived Etude-Bach and Chopin Concerto again, in 1942, at the Jacob's Pillow Dance Festival in the Berkshires. There the cast included dancers Nina Youshkevitch, Marina Svetlova, and Nikita Tallin; while Ann Hutchinson Guest danced in the corps.

==== 'Ballet Russe de Monte Carlo' under Denham in New York: Snow Maiden. ====
Nijinska choreographed Snow Maiden in 1942 with music by Glazunov, for 'Ballet Russe de Monte Carlo' under Serge Denham as Artistic Director. Snow Maiden drew on Russian folklore. The maiden, the Frost King's daughter, would melt in the sun's heat if she fell in love with a mortal man. The choreography "did not open any new avenues of artistic exploration." Yet critic Edwin Denby notes that "by preserving just enough independence of rhythm in relation to the sugary Glazounoff score [her groupings and dance phrases] keep a certain acid edge."

A revision of the Chopin Concerto was staged by Nijinska also in 1942. Originally written in 1937 for the award-winning Polish Ballet, the influential New York Times dance critic John Martin ranked it highly. Yet he considered Chopin (and Tchaikovsky) as no longer current. In 1943 Nijinska choreographed the Ancient Russia ballet, music by Tchaikovsky, with memorable visual designs by her theater colleague Nathalie Gontcharova.

For Denham's company Nijinska and Balanchine "were well-known choreographers on whom he could call." It was, however, "not Nijinska but another woman-an American-who revitalized the Ballets Russes in 1942. Agnes de Mille [did it with her] Rodeo ..."

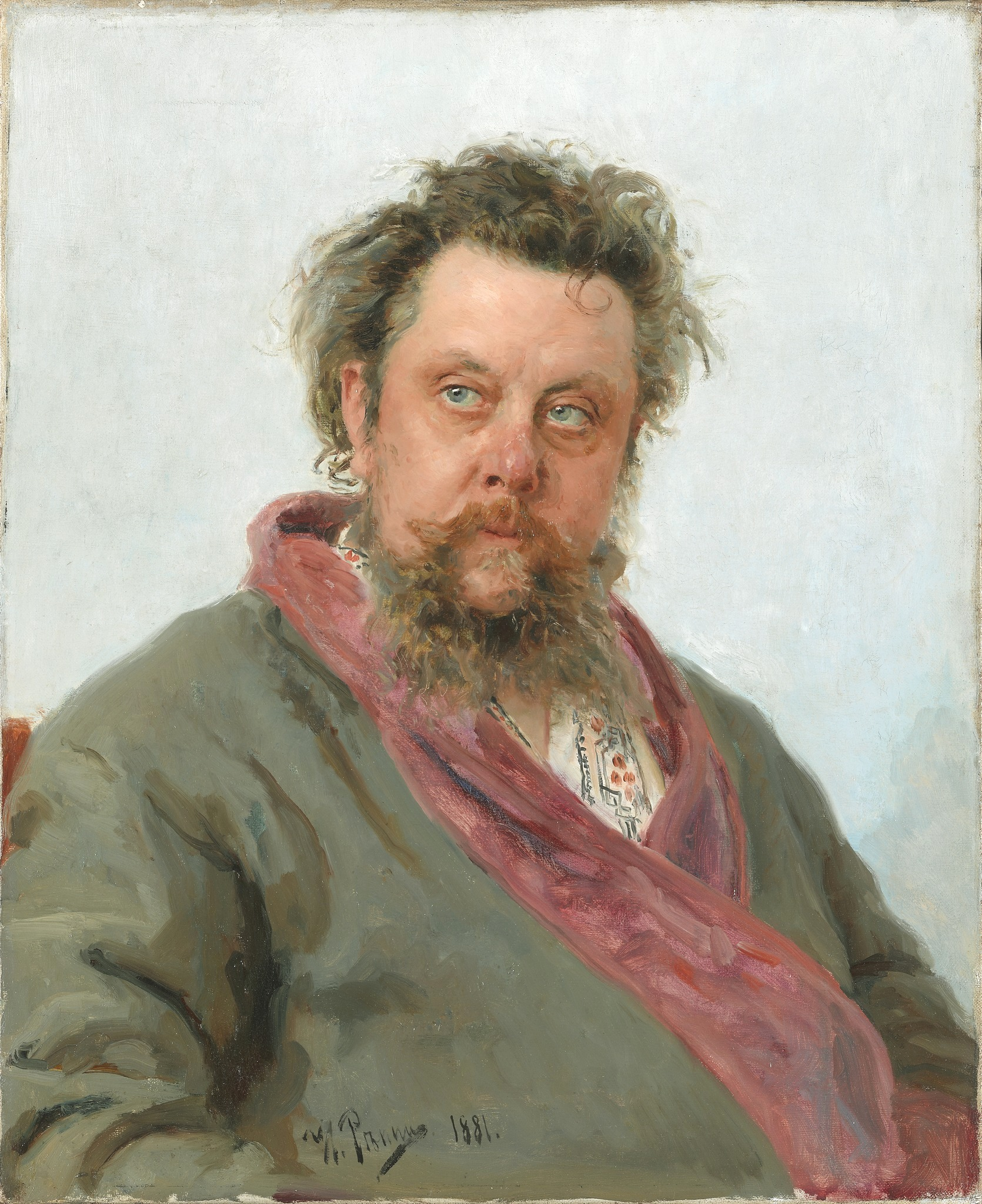
Mussorgsky's 1881 portrait by Ilya Repin, ten days before Mussorgsky's death

==== 'Ballet International' in New York: Pictures at an Exhibition ====
During the 1940s and into the 1950s, Nijinska served as the ballet mistress for the International Ballet, later known variously, e.g., the Grand Ballet du Marquis de Cuevas. The company played chiefly in Europe and the Mediterranean until 1961.

In 1944 for an opening at the International Theater in New York she choreographed Pictures at an Exhibition, an 1874 suite of piano pieces by Modest Mussorgsky, later orchestrated by Maurice Ravel, and by Ivan Boutnikov. Mussorgsky wrote no ballet music, but two of his compositions inspired Nijinska: Night on Bald Mountain (Ballets Russes 1924), and here Pictures.

Costumes and decor were by Boris Aronson. Aronson was an apprentice of Aleksandra Ekster, Nijinska's designer in Kiev and Paris. Evidently Nijinska was the first to choreograph Pictures. The next ballet to this music was staged by Erika Hanka at the Vienna State Opera (1947), and then by Lopokov at the Bolshoi in Moscow (1963).

In 1952 also for Marquis de Cuevas' Grand Ballet de Monte Carlo, Nijinska choreographed Rondo Capriccioso. Composed in 1863 by Saint-Saëns, it was originally crafted for the virtuoso violinist Pablo de Sarasate. The 1952 ballet by Nijinska opened in Paris at the Théâtre de l'Empire, with principal dancers Rosella Hightower and George Skibine.

=== Revivals of her choreographies 1960–1971, & After ===
==== 'Grand Ballet du Marquis de Cuevas' in New York: The Sleeping Beauty ====
In 1960 the Cuevas Ballet produced a revision of The Sleeping Beauty, which was to have been staged by Nijinska. She was familiar with the ballet from Diaghilev's production of 1921. For it she had created several popular dances. In 1922 she and Stravinsky abbreviated it into the successful one-act ballet Aurora's Wedding.

Long associated with the Cuevas company as ballet mistress, Nijinska began to craft her choreographic revision. A conflict, however, developed over the ballet which involved artistic issues. In discussions she declined to compromise. Nijinska withdrew from the company. Robert Helpmann then came into the process. A dancer, he had also staged ballets, and had long partnered with Fonteyn, namely in The Royal Ballet's post-war The Sleeping Beauty. In the end the Cuevas company gave its choreographic credit to both, as Nijinska-Helpmann.

==== 'The Royal Ballet' of London: Les Biches and Les noces ====
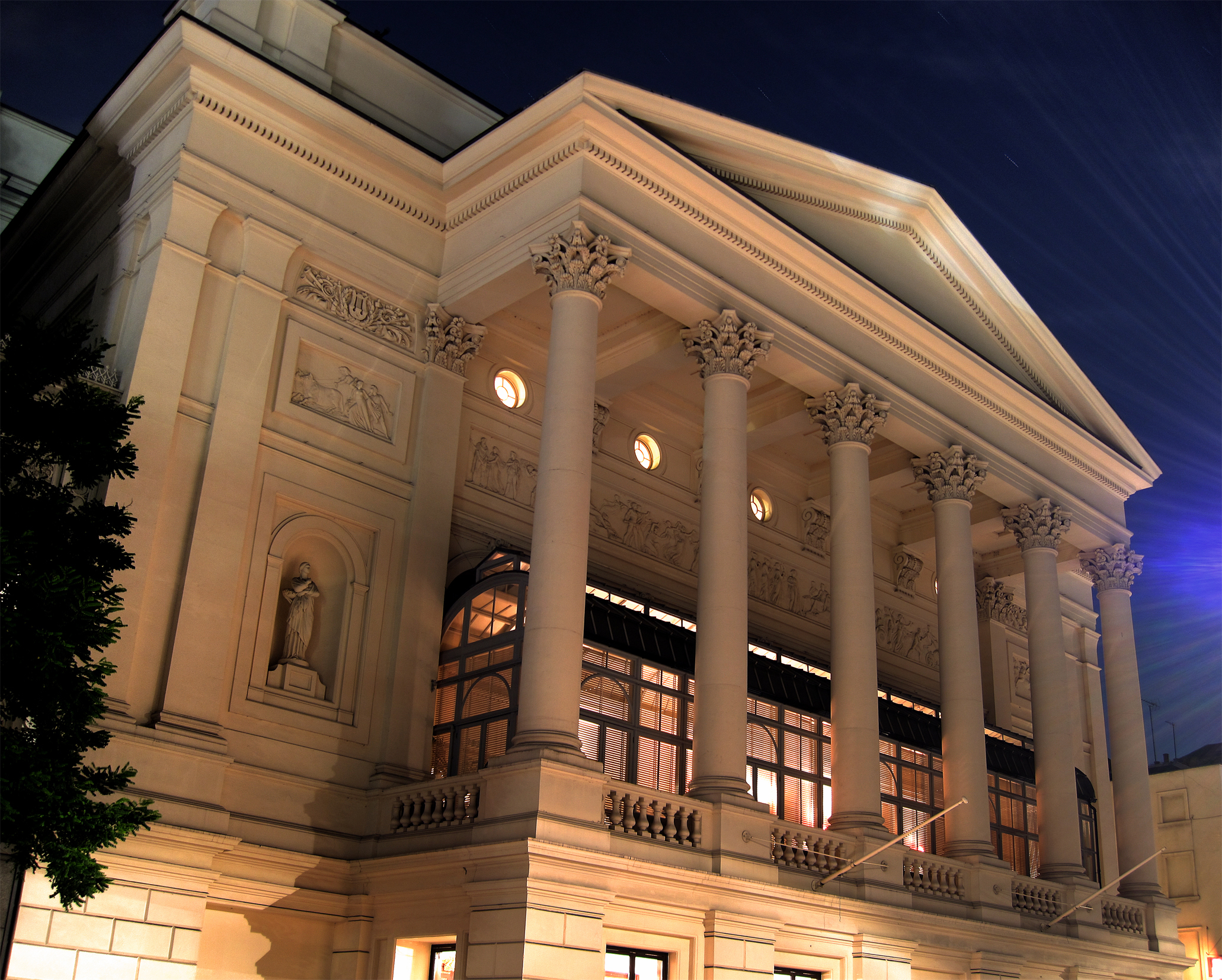
Royal Opera House, Bow St. facade, 2009

In 1964 Frederick Ashton of The Royal Ballet asked Nijinska to stage a revival of her ballet Les Biches (1924) at Covent Gardens. Ashton had been resident choreographer for The Royal Ballet since 1935. Then becoming also an associate director in 1952, he was appointed the Royal Ballet's director in 1963.

Nijinska first mentored Ashton's career from when he was a young ballet student. In 1928 in Paris she'd been the choreographer for Ida Rubenstein, where he'd become a dancer in the company. He performed in several of choreographed works by Nijinska under her guidance. Ashton consider her a beneficial influence in the development of ballet. More specifically, her choreography had informed his own progress in that art. The staging of the revived Les Biches went well. Two years later, Ashton asked her to return to London and stage her Les noces (1923) on his company.

These 1964 London productions, according to dance critic Horst Koegler, "confirmed her reputation as one of the formative choreographers of the 20th century." In 1934 Ashton had expressed his own opinion:

Her achievements have proved to me time and again that through the medium of classical ballet any emotion may be expressed. She might be called the architect of dancing, building her work brick by brick into the amazing structures that result in masterpieces like Les noces.

==== Other stagings: Brahms Variations, Le Mariage d'Aurore, Chopin Concerto ====
Following these London events, Nijinska "was repeatedly invited to revive several of her ballets". She staged Les Biches in Rome in 1969, and in Florence and Washington in 1970. Also Les Biches, and a revised version of Chopin Concerto and Brahms Variations, for the Center Ballet of Buffalo in 1969.

Les noces was staged in 1971 in Venice, where during a rehearsal at the Teatro Fenice, she celebrated her eightieth birthday onstage. "Between 1968 and 1972, Nijinska saw performances of Les Biches, Les noces, Brahms Variations, Le Mariage d'Aurore, and Chopin Concerto for ballet companies in the United States and in Europe."

==== Irina Nijinska's further revivals, and others ====
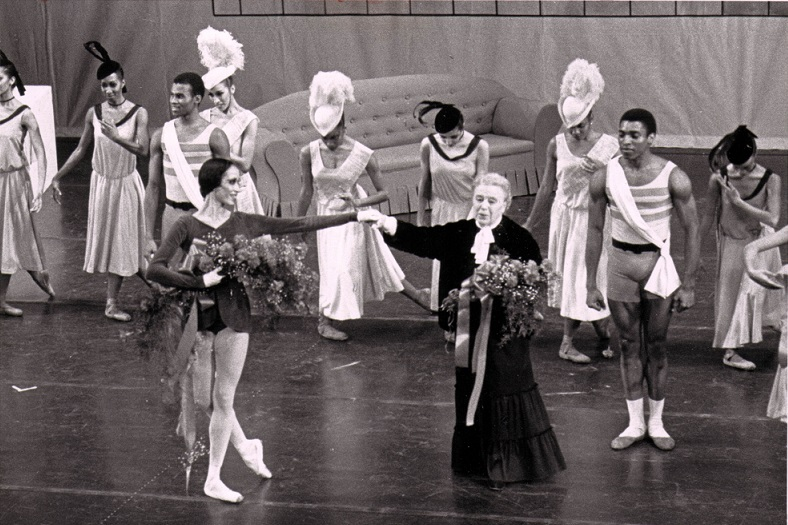
Virginia Johnson, Irina Nijinska, and Eddie J.Shellman after the Dance Theatre of Harlem premiere of Les Biches.

After her death in 1972, her daughter Irina Nijinska (1913-1991) continued this work. A growing number of performances of her mother's early ballets were performed. Several entered into the current repertoire of dance companies. Included were works first produced by Ballets Russes.

Irina, a dancer in her own right, had been helping her mother for many years, at her ballet school and as her rehearsal assistant. During the 1970s and 1980s, Irina advanced her legacy. She edited and translated Early Memoirs and saw it to publication. In the theatrical world Irina Nijinska associated with ballet companies to facilitate revivals of the choreographies. Les noces and Les Biches increasingly appeared on stage.

Among others, Irina brought Les noces to The Paris Opera Ballet, and "Rondo Capriccioso" to the Dance Theater of Harlem. In collaboration with a dance historian, the French Riviera comedy "Le Train Bleu" was reconstructed; then it was staged by the Oakland Ballet. In 1981 the Dance Theatre of Harlem under Arthur Mitchell "produced an entire Nijinska evening". After Irina's passing in 1991, the Nijinska revivals continued.

Ballerina Nina Youshkevitch, a Nijinska dancer (e.g., at the Jacob's Pillow Dance Festival in 1942), revived Bolero for the Oakland Ballet in 1995. She also staged Chopin Concerto for students at Goucher College in Maryland that same year.

== Commentary on her Choreography ==
=== Critiques by dance press & academia ===
Instead, she preferred the pre-war Diaghilev who had been "searching for the creation of a new ballet ..." Hence regarding The Sleeping Princess Nijinska recalled the paradox that "I started my first work full of protest against myself." "Because she stemmed from the academic ballet tradition, Bronislava Nijinska is often called a Neo-Classicist. But her choreography also has an affinity to such styles of modern art as Cubism, Constructivism and Expressionism." Over the course of her career Nijinska, in her effort to augment classical ballet with new ideas about the art of movement, neither crossed over to champion a newly fashioned modernity, nor did she accept as timelessly classic the inherited ballet tradition. She declined her brother Nijinsky's turn to modern dance. Instead, following the new insights into movement, she initiated "what would be called neoclassical choreography". She eventually came to admire Petipa's work, while pruning its "nondance elements". A "renewable legacy was at the heart of Nijinska's classicism". As "one of the twentieth-century ballet's great innovators ... her repertoire introduced a new classicism that made dance a medium of modern art expression." Her Les noces (1923) bridged the contemporary tensions "between primitivism and mechanization, exoticism and neoclassicism, Russianess and cosmopolitanism, Soviet and émigré. ... The ability of Les noces to negotiate so many different boundaries ... accounts in no small measure for its timely, as well as timeless success."

== Working style as described by others ==
Margaret Severn, a dancer who did both vaudeville and classical, was for a time in 1931 a leading dancer in Nijinska's Paris-based company. Sometimes she'd abbreviate Nijinska as "Nij". Later she wrote an article from her notes at the time:

"I was very favorably impressed with [Nijinska] personality. She is somewhat crazy, of course, but really a great artist. I could tell from the little she showed, and she had a marvelous technique herself. So I would simply adore to be in the company ..." "Nij arranged a very short but very snappy little dance for me in the 'Variations'. ... [T]his half minute is quite likely to bring the house down. ... The dance is one of the most brilliant and most difficult concoctions I have ever seen."

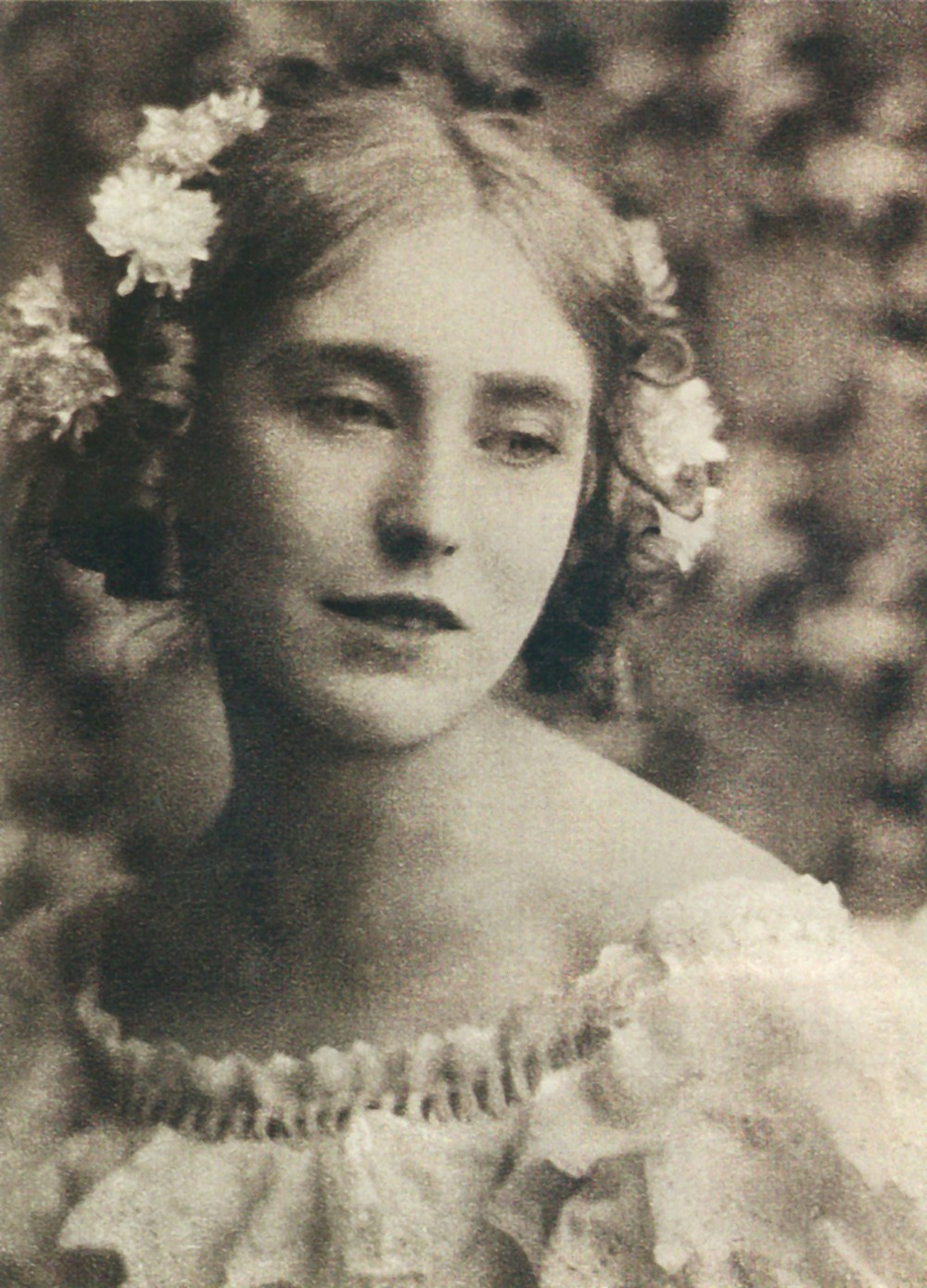
Sokolova, 1914.

Lydia Sokolova, an English ballerina, performed in Ballets Russes from 1913 to 1929. Circa 1920 she married Leon Woizikovsky, also a dancer in the company. Her memoirs were edited by Richard Buckle and published in London in 1960.

"Bronislava Nijinska, known as Bronia, was very like her brother Vaslav Nijinsky. She was blonde and wore her straight hair screwed into a tight little roll. She had pale eyes and pouting lips, wore no makeup at all and had not shaved off her eyebrows as most of us had in those days. ... Bronia was obstinate and once she had made up her mind nothing in the world would move her. She was brilliantly clever and inventive. No music seemed to present any difficulties for her, but her style of movement was even more pronounced and idiosyncratic than that of Massine, and she was not an easy person to work for in class or at rehearsal ... Her system of training seemed to depend more on improvisation than on traditional methods of technique ... [T]o watch her devise a sequence of steps and movements for one of her ballets was most interesting. I liked her, in spite of her moodiness and lack of humor." "There were two of us in the company whom Diaghilev could always make cry whenever he wished, Nijinska and myself."

As one of the three Russian baby ballerinas the teenager Irina Baronova worked with Nijinska the choreographer in the mid-1930s. She later described the experience.

The ideas were clear from the very beginning; and even though there was obviously a prearranged structure, once she was in the studio she involved the dancers in the creative process. ... Her choreography seemed to flow spontaneously. Even when she was improvising, she always projected the conviction that she knew her ultimate goals, for she was precise and direct in her explanations.

Alexandra Danilova (1903-1997) wrote in her memoir Choura (published in 1986), about her time in the Ballet Russe company under René Blum, circa 1934.

Nijinska taught me how to act with my body--how to sit, how to walk. A great actress expresses what she is feeling with her body and her voice... and Nijinska helped me to find that expression in dance--how to convey sorrow by turning my back to the audience... . This was one of the most valuable lessons of my career, and I applied it to all the dramatic roles I danced, not only to my roles in her ballets.

== Studios in Los Angeles, from 1940 ==
After the start in 1939 of World War II in Europe, Nijinska and her family moved to New York in that October, then to Los Angeles in 1940. "Bronislava Nijinska did not understand Americans, or they her. She was almost deaf by the time she reached the United States, and life (exile, her brother's madness, her son's death) had let her down badly."

Yet she continued as a ballet mistress and guest choreographer, work that continued into the 1960s (see section above). In Los Angeles she began to teach ballet in a private studio, and she opened her own school in 1941. Her daughter Irina Nijinska would run the school in her absence. Bronislava became a citizen of the United States in 1949.

=== Teaching dance ===
Throughout her career, starting earlier than her 1919 'L'Ecolé de Mouvement' in Kiev, Nijinska had taught dance. A ballet role to her colleagues she'd demonstrate, or to the cast her newly created choreographies. In 1922 she had started teaching at Ballets Russes, taking over from Enrico Cecchetti. Among her earlier students: Serge Lifar in revolutionary Kiev; Anton Dolin, Lydia Sokolova, Frederick Ashton, Alicia Markova, Irina Baronova, David Lichine in interwar Europe; Lucia Chase in New York. Her auditions in the 1930s were conducted in the form of a short class.

In 1935 rehearsals for Les Cent Baisers, choreographer Nijinska coached the youthful Irina Baronova in her leading role as the Princess. Already relatively widely experienced in ballet performance, Baronova was developing rapidly into a modern classical ballerina. According to author Vicente García-Márquez, however, Nijinska was key.

Working with Nijinska was a turning point in her artistic growth. Before she had never had the opportunity for careful dissection of her roles. Nijinska's approach ... gave the sixteen-year-old Baronova the self-awareness she needed to probe into herself and bring forth her full potential.

In New York Nijinska was invited to come teach in Hollywood. She eventually opened her own ballet studio there in 1941. Required to travel afar to pursue her choreographic work, she frequently left her daughter Irina Nijinska in charge. At her Hollywood studio (soon relocated to Beverly Hills), students included the prima ballerinas Maria Tallchief and Marjorie Tallchief (sisters), as well as Cyd Charisse, and later Allegra Kent.

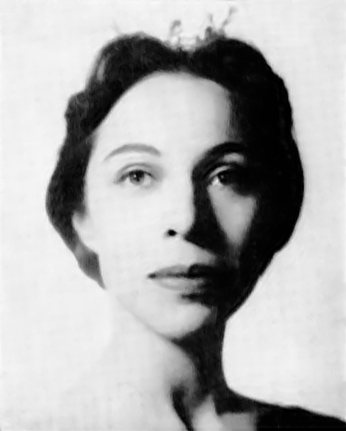
Maria Tallchief in 1961.

Maria Tallchief (1925-2013) studied with Nijinska, "all through my high school years". Everyone, recalled Tallchief, was in awe of her. "She jumped and flashed around the studio. I was under her spell." Despite "luminous green eyes" she dressed very plainly. Her husband translated. "Madame say when you sleep, sleep like a ballerina. Even on street waiting for bus, stand like a ballerina." Yet "Madame Nijinska rarely spoke. She didn't have to. She had incredible personal magnetism". From her "I first learned that the dancer's soul is in the middle of the body". When Ballets Russes de Monte Carlo came to perform in Los Angeles, the ballet dancers came to Madame to take lessons. "And the biggest star of all, Alexandra Danilova, gave Nijinska roses when she entered the studio".

Allegra Kent (born 1937) recalls starting ballet lessons in 1949 when she was twelve. Madame Nijinska was a "nice-looking woman in black lounge pajamas with a long cigarette holder". She counted time "ras, va, tri" in Russian. "Her husband was simultaneously translating everything she said into English." Because of her commanding presence in classes, "The world began and ended right there in that moment." After a year with her daughter Irina Nijinska, Kent studied with 'Madame' herself. She learned "not to fear competing with men" and that "the light look of dance was merely the surface of a sculpture-there was a mixture of steel and quicksilver at the heart."

=== Work on her Memoirs ===
The last year of her life Nijinska devoted to finishing memoirs about her early life. She had notebooks of her writings and had kept theatrical programs throughout her career. A manuscript of 180,000 words was left completed. Following her death in early 1972, Bronislava Nijinska's daughter Irina Nijinska was named her literary executor. Then she and Jean Rawlingson edited and translated the Russian manuscript into English. They edited the text, and saw it through to publication. The book Early Memoirs appeared in 1981. These writings describe in detail her early years traveling in provincial Russia with her dancer parents, her brother Vaslav's development as a dancer, her schooling and first years as a professional in the Diaghilev era of Russian ballet, and her work assisting her brother in his choreography. During her life, she had published a book and several articles on ballet.

"The full autobiographical story of her own career, however, is contained in another set of her memoirs, continuing from the 1914 close of [her Early Memoirs]." She also left a set of notebooks on ballet and other writings, which remain unpublished. Dance historian and critic Lynn Garafola is said to be currently working on a biography of Bronislava Nijinska.

== Personal, family life ==
=== Mother and father ===
After her parents separated, Vaslav had turned against his father Tomasz [Foma] Nijinsky, because of his infidelity. Bronislava, however, remained attached to her absent father, who visited from time to time. She followed his career, championing his times of subsequent success in ballet. With Tomasz her mother eventually reached some understanding. In 1912 her father died in Russia. Her oldest brother Stanislav (Stassik), by a doctor's instructions placed in a sanitariums since 1902, died in Russia in 1918.

In 1921 Nijinska with her mother Eleanora Bereda Nijinska and her two children left Russia, a perilous undertaking. They made their way to Austria, to meet her brother, his wife, and children. Nijinska then rejoined Ballets Russes, chiefly in Paris and Monte Carlo, until 1925. Thereafter she worked independently, often on tour. Throughout Bronislava remained close to her mother the retired dancer whom she called "Mamusia". She wrote her when away and shared her thoughts when near. She cared for her when ill, until she died in 1932.

=== Her brother Vaslav ===
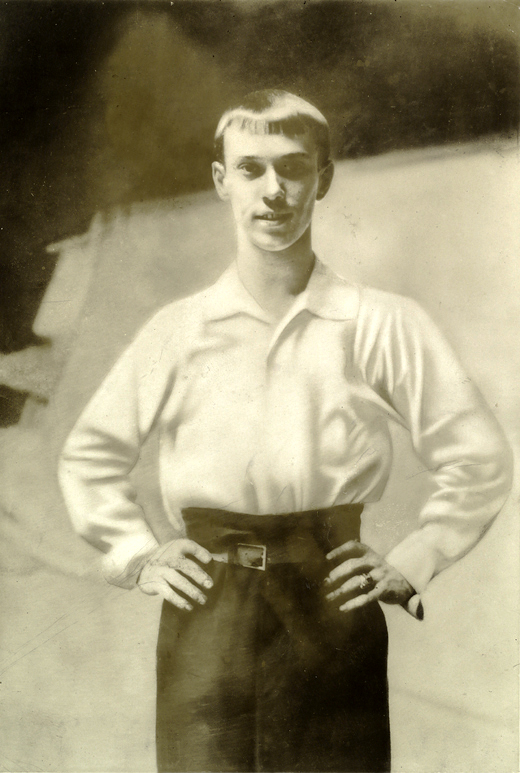
Vaslav 'Vatsa' Nijinsky in 1907, age 17.

During her early years and into her mid-twenties, Bronislava Nijinsky was under the strong influence of her older brother Vaslav Nijinsky, whose brilliance became widely celebrated. Both Vatsa and Broni were trained from the start by their dancer parents. She learned from her brother's example, as he preceded her in their childhood adventures, in ballet school, and then on the stage. When Nijinsky came to design his first choreographies, Nijinska as a ballet dancer assisted, following his detailed instructions as he tried out new steps and innovative poses. Her 1912 marriage, however, shook the artistic "bond between the brother and sister". Bronia nonetheless continued her sibling loyalty. She showed her support for Vaslav's career, especially during his 1914 production of Season Nijinsky in London.

In 1913 Vaslav married Romola de Pulszky suddenly while in Argentina. It was a confounding surprise to his mother and sister. In 1917 his ballet career ended in confusion and controversy. Thereafter he lived with Romola and their children in Switzerland for many years. He died in Sussex, UK, in 1950. Vaslav was survived by his wife and by Kyra and Tamara, their two daughters; and by Tamara's daughter, and by Kyra's son Vaslav Markevitch. In 1931 Kyra had danced in her aunt Bronia's company 'Ballets Nijinska'.

=== Marriages, children ===
Nijinska married twice. Her first husband, Alexandre Kochetovsky, was a fellow dancer for Ballets Russes. She calls him 'Sasha' in her Early Memoirs. Married in London in 1912, they soon left for Russia. She gave birth to two children: their daughter Irina Nijinska in 1913 in Saint Petersburg (called 'Irushka'), and Leon Kochetovsky, their son in 1919 in Kiev (called 'Levushka'). Their marriage had entered difficult times, first during war and then in revolution. They continuously had worked together in dance productions. After Leon was born, Bronia and Sasha separated. He moved to Odessa. In 1921 Nijinska left Soviet Russia with her children and her mother. After meeting again briefly in 1921 in London, they were divorced in 1924. Their son Leon was killed in a traffic accident in 1935. Their daughter Irina, who'd become a ballet dancer, was seriously injured in that 1935 traffic collision. In 1946 Irina married Gibbs S. Raetz, and they had two children, Natalie and George. After her mother's death in 1972, she edited her Memoirs and managed revivals of her ballets. Irina died in 1991.

A love of her life, but whom she did not marry, was also a theatrical personality, the Russian opera singer and renowned basso, Feodor Chaliapin (1873–1938). Their career paths had crossed several times, but for a romance to blossom their circumstances worked against them. Yet their strong artistic link and mutual admiration continued. He remained a treasured source of her musical and theatrical inspiration.

Nijinska's second marriage in 1924 was to Nicholas Singaevsky (called 'Kolya'). A few years her junior, he'd been a former student and dancer at the 'Ecole de Mouvement' she had founded in Kiev following the Russian Revolution. He, too, had left Russia. They met again as exiles in Monte Carlo. He became associated with Ballets Russes as a dancer. They were married in 1924. During their four decades together, he often worked in production and management, acting as her business partner in staging her various ballet productions and other projects. In America he also translated for her, especially when she taught at the ballet studio. He died in Los Angeles, California, in 1968, four years before her.

Bronislava Nijinska died on February 21, 1972, in Pacific Palisades, California, after suffering a heart attack. She was 81. She was survived by her daughter, son-in-law, and two grandchildren.

=== In fine arts ===
On 11 June 2011, a sculpture of the Polish/Russian dancers Vaslav Nijinsky and his sister Bronislava Nijinska was unveiled at the Teatr Wielki, its foyer. See photograph at start of this article. They are portrayed in their roles as Faun and Nymph from the ballet L’après-midi d’un faune. Commissioned by the Polish National Ballet, the sculpture was made in bronze by Ukrainian sculptor Giennadij Jerszow.

== See also ==
- Buffalo Ballet Theater
- Category:Ballets by Bronislava Nijinska
- List of dancers
- List of Russian ballet dancers
- Polish National Ballet

== Bibliography ==
=== Primary ===
- Bronislava Nijinska, "On Movement and the School of Movement" from her choreographic notebooks 1919-1925, as translated from Russian original by Anya Lem and Thelwall Proctor, edited by Joan Ross Acocella and Lynn Garafola, text in Baer (1986), pp. 85–87 [cf. p. 88, nn1+3], and apparently in Ballet Review, 13/4 (Winter 1986), [cited by Garafola (1989), p. 203, n10]. An "abbreviated and highly revised version" [according to Baer (1986), p. 88, n3] in Schrifttanz, Wien 1930. Also: edited by Valerie Preston-Dunlop and Susanne Lahusen in Schrifttanz: A view of German dance in the Weimar Republic (London: Dance Books 1990) [cited by Garafola (1989), p. 203, n7].
- Bronislava Nijinska, "Reflections about the production of Les Biches and Hamlet in Markova-Dolin ballets", translated by Lydia Lopokova for Dancing Times (Feb. 1937), p. 617, [cited by Baer (1986), p. 103].
- Bronislava Nijinska, "Creation of Les noces", translated by Jean M. Serafetinides and Irina Nijinska, for Dance Magazine, (Dec. 1974) v.48/no.12, pp. 558–61, [cited by Baer (1986), p. 103].
- Bronislava Nijinska, "The Triumph of Petipa", in A. Nekhendzi, ed., Marius Petipa. Materialny, Vospominania, Stat'i (Leningrad: Leningrad State Theater Museum, no date), v.I, p. 317, [cited by Garafola (2005), p. 203, n3].
- Bronislava Nijinska, Early Memoirs (New York: Holt Rinehart Winston 1981; reprint 1992, Duke University), translated and edited by Irina Nijinska and Jean Rawlinson, with an Introduction by and in consultation with Anna Kisselgoff.
  - Irina Nijinska, "Bronislava Nijinska: Highlights of Choreographic Career" at pp. 519–523 in Nijinska (1981).
  - Holly Brubach, "A Life in Dance", book review of Nijinska's Early Memoirs, in The New York Times, Sep 20, 1981. Accessed 2017-04-28.

=== Secondary ===
Biographies

- Nancy Van Norman Baer, Bronislava Nijinska. A dancer's legacy (Fine Arts Museums of San Francisco 1986).
- Lynn Garafola, La Nijinska: Choreographer of the Modern (Oxford University 2022).

Articles

- Joan Acocella, "Nijinsky/Nijinska Revivals: The Rite Stuff," in Art in America, October 1991, pp. 128–137 and 167-171.
- Joan Acocella, "Secrets of Nijinsky" in The New York Review of Books, Jan. 14, 1999. Accessed 2017-05-11.
- Jack Anderson, "Preserving Nijinska's Ballets. A family affair" in The New York Times, August 18, 1991". Accessed 2017-04-28.
- Jack Anderson, "Irina Nijinska, 77, champion of her mother's work, is dead", in The New York Times, July 4, 1991'. Acc'd 2018-1-18.
- Jack Anderson, "Dance: Spoleto Festival: Nijinska's 'Les noces'", in The New York Times, June 5, 1982. Accessed 2017-6-28,
- Jack Anderson, "La Nijinska" in The Dancing Times (April 1972).
- Jack Anderson. "The Fabulous Career of Bronislava Nijinska" in Dance Magazine, August 1963, pp. 40–46.
- Lisa C.Arkin. "Bronislava Nijinska and the Polish Ballet, 1937-1938: Missing Chapter of the Legacy," in Dance Research Journal, 24/2, (Fall 1992), pp. 1–16.
- Nancy Van Norman Baer (NVB), "Bronislava Nijinska" at pp. 214–220 in Carnes, editor, Invisible Giants: Fifty Americans... (Oxford University 2002).
- Alexandre Benois, "On the origins of Ballets Russes" (1944), in Kochno (1970), pp. 2–21.
- R. C. Elwood, "Nijinska, Bronislava (1891–1972)", in Anne Commire, ed., Women in World History (Gale 2002). Acc'd 2017-04-29.
- Drue Fergison, "Bringing Les noces to the Stage" in Garafola and Baer (1999).
- Lynn Garafola, "An amazon of the avant-garde: Bronislava Nijinska in revolutionary Russia" in Dance Research (2011/2012), vol.29, pp. 109–166.
- Lynn Garafola, "Choreography by Nijinska" at pp. 194–204 in her Legacies of twentieth-century dance (2005).
- Lynn Garafola, "Rivals for the New. The Ballets Suédois and the Ballets Russes" in Baer, editor, Paris Modern. The Swedish Ballet 1920-1925 (San Francisco: Fine Arts Museum 1996).
- Marina Harss, "Revisiting 'The Fairy's kiss', a ballet about an artist's destiny", in New York Times, Feb. 7, 2017. Acc'd 2017-6-28.
- Ruth Eleanor Howard, "Nijinska Visits America: The Sister of the Great Nijinsky Is Interviewed," in The American Dancer, July 1935.
- Goncharova, Natalia (Spring 1979). "The Metamorphosis of the Ballet 'Les noces'". Leonardo. 12 (2): 137–143. doi:10.2307/1573841. JSTOR 1573841. S2CID 191378240.
- Robert Johnson. "Ritual and Abstraction in Nijinska's Les noces," in The Dance Chronicle, Vol. 10, Number 2, 1987, pp. 147–169.
- Robert Johnson, "Go Russes, Young Man," in Ballet Review, 37.4, Winter 2009/10, pp. 34–42.
- Anna Kisselgoff, "Nijinska, in her time, was a ballet avant gardist" in The New York Times, May 11, 1986. Accessed 2017-04-28.
- Anna Kisselgoff, "Dance: The 1923 Nijinska-Stravinsky 'Les noces'", The New York Times, Dec. 15, 1984. Accessed 2017-6-28.
- Anna Kisselgoff, "Bronislava Nijinska is dead at 81", obituary in The New York Times, February 23, 1972. Accessed 2017-04-28.
- Valerie Lawson, "Bronislava Nijinska - 'downright difficult and determined'", at Dancelines website (2011). Accessed 2017-04-28.
- Dawn Lille, "Dance: Nijinska, Stravinsky, Les noces, Juilliard" in Art Times Journal (May/June 2011). Accessed 2017-04-28.
- Maureen E. Maryanski, "Bronislava Nijinska (1891–1972)", in Dance Heritage Coalition, 2013. Accessed 2017-04-28.
- Carmen Paris & Javier Bayo, "Nijinska, Bronislava (1891-1972)", in MCNBiografías. Accessed 2018-4-6.
- Maria Ratanova, "The choreographic avant-garde in Kyiv 1916-1921: Bronislava Nijinska & her Ecole de Mouvement" in Makaryk & Tkacz (2010).
- Octavio Roca, "Passion, Possession in Stunning Bolero, Oakland revives steamy Nijinska ballet", in SF Gate, Oct. 23, 1995. Accessed 2018-1-18.
- Lorna Sanders, "Les noces (Svadebka/The Wedding)" in Dancing Times, vol. 95 (Oct. 2004), pp. 48–53.
- Margaret Severn, "Dancing with Nijinska" in Dance Chronicle (1988), reprinted at pp. 690–697 in Gottlieb (2008).
- Steve Shelokhonov, "Bronslava Nijinska Biography" at IMDb. Accessed 2017-04-28.
- Maria Tallchief with Larry Kaplan, "Maria Tallchief. America's Prima Ballerina" in The Washington Post, 1997. Accessed 2017-04-28.
- David Vaughan, "Classicism and Neoclassicism" in Garafola and Baer (1999).
  - Obituary: "Irina Nijinska; Restaged historic ballets" in The Los Angeles Times, July 6, 1991. Accessed 2018-3-15.
  - Dance Heritage Coalition, Bronislava Nijinska books and articles. Accessed 2017-04-28.

Media

- The Paris Opera Ballet, Paris dances Diaghilev (Elektra Nonsuch 1991), VHS [includes Les noces).
- The Paris Opera Ballet, Picasso and Dance (Kultur 1994), DVD (includes Le Train Bleu).
  - Joffrey Ballet, "Les noces" (The Wedding), [program] premier: Oct 6, 1989, Washington, D.C. Accessed 2017-6-28.
  - Library of Congress, Bronislava Nijinska Collection. Accessed 2017-04-28.
  - Unedited photographs, including of Nijinska's Les noces (brown and white costumes), at Google (n.d.).
- Lynn Garafola, "Bronislava Nijinska: A choreographer's journey", audio of lecture (1:13:47) at the National Gallery of Art, July 7, 2013. Accessed 2017-04-28.
- Alison Gibson, producer, Nijinska: A legend in dance, KQED-TV, 1990 Emmy Award.

Books

- Jack Anderson, The One and Only. The Ballet Russe de Monte Carlo (New York: Dance Horizons 1981).
- George Balanchine, Balanchine's complete stories of the great ballets (New York: Doubleday 1954).
- Alexander Bland, The Royal Ballet. The first 50 years (New York: Threshold/Doubleday 1981), foreword by Ninette de Valois.
- Mary Clarke and Clement Crisp, Ballet. An illustrated history (London: A & C Black 1973; rev'd 1992, Hamish Hamilton, London).
- Alexandra Danilova, Choura (New York: Alfred A. Knopf 1986, reprint 1988 Fromm International, New York).
- Agnes de Mille, The Book of the Dance (London: Paul Hamlyn 1963).
- Agnes de Mille, Portrait Gallery (Boston: Houghton, Mifflin 1990).
- Christina Ezrahi, Swans of the Kremlin: Ballet and Power in Soviet Russia (Pittsburg University 2012).
- Michel Fokine, Memoirs of a ballet master (Boston: Little, Brown 1961), translated by Vitale Fokine.
- Lynn Garafola, Legacies of twentieth-century dance (Wesleyan University 2005).
- Lynn Garafola, Diaghilev's Ballets Russes (Oxford University 1989, reprint Da Capo Press).
- Vincente García-Márquez, The Ballets Russes. Colonel de Basil's Ballets Russes de Monte Carlo 1932–1952 (NY: Knopf 1990).
- Robert Gottlieb, George Balanchine. The ballet maker (New York: Harper Perennial 2004).
- Robert Greskovic, Ballet. A complete guide ([NY: Hyperion 1998], London: Robert Hale 2000).
- Arnold L. Haskell with Walter Nouvel, Diaghileff. His artistic and private life (New York: Simon and Schuster 1935).
- Jennifer Homans, Apollo's Angels. A history of ballet (New York: Random House 2010).
- Jennifer Homans, Mr. B. George Balanchine's 20th century (New York: Random House 2022).
- Allegra Kent, Once a Dancer. An autobiography (New York: St. Martin's Press 1997).
- Boris Kochno, Diaghilev and the Ballets Russes (New York: Harper and Row 1970).
- John Martin, The Dance. The story of the dance told in pictures and texts (New York: Tudor 1946),
- John Martin, The Modern Dance (New York: A. S. Barnes 1933, reprint: Dance Horizons, New York 1990).
- Léonide Massine, My Life in Ballet (London: Macmillan 1968).
- Lucy Moore, Nijinsky (London: Profile Books 2013, 2014).
- Romola Nijinsky, Nijinsky (New York: Simon and Schuster 1934, reprint Pocket Books 1972).
- Peter Ostwald, Vaslav Nijinsky. A leap into madness (New York: Lyle Stuart 1991).
- Nancy Reynolds and Malcolm McCormick, No Fixed Points. Dance in the twentieth century (Yale University 2003).
- Janice Ross, Like a Bomb going off. Leonid Yakobson and ballet as resistance in Soviet Russia Yale University 2015).
- Lydia Sokolova, Dancing for Diaghilev. Memoirs ... (London: John Murray 1960, reprint San Francisco 1989), Richard Buckle, ed.
- Elizabeth Souritz, Soviet Choreographers in the 1920s (Iskusstvo 1979; Dance Books & Duke University 1990).
- Igor Stravinsky, Chroniques de ma vie (Paris 1935), transl. as Stravinsky: An autobiography (NY: Simon & Schuster 1936).
- Igor Stravinsky, Poetics of Music (1940; London: Geoffrey Cumberlege 1947).
- Igor Stravinsky and Robert Craft, Exposition and Development (London: Faber & Farver 1962)
- Eric Walter White, Stravinsky: The composer and his work (Berkeley: University of California 1966).
- Vicki Woolf, Dancing in the Vortex: The Story of Ida Rubinstein (Routledge 2001).

reference books or edited books

- Willi Apel, et al., Harvard Dictionary of Music (Harvard University 1944, 2d ed. 1969, 1972).
- Lynn Garafola and Nancy Van Norman Baer, editors, The Ballets Russes and its World (Yale University 1999).
- Robert Gottlieb, editor, Reading Dance (New York: Pantheon 2008).
- Horst Koegler, The Concise Oxford Dictionary of Ballet ([1972]; Oxford University 1977).
- Irena Rima Makaryk and Virlana Tkacz, editors, Modernism in Kiev: Jubilant Experimentation (University of Toronto 2010).

Inspired by Nijinska

- Eva Stachniak, The Chosen Maiden (Penguin Random House 2017) [historical novel].
- Kate Westbrook, "The Nijinska Chamber", K W Recordings, 2006 [audio].
