= Nijinsky (disambiguation) =

Nijinsky (Polish: Niżyński; feminine: Niżyńska, plural: Niżyńscy) may refer to:

- Vaslav Nijinsky (1890–1950), ballet dancer and choreographer
- Bronislava Nijinska (1890–1972), dancer, choreographer and teacher
- Kyra Nijinsky (1914–1998), ballet dancer
- Nijinsky (film) (1980)
- Nijinsky (horse), race horse
- Nijinsky Stakes (disambiguation), various horse races named after the above
