= Cuban invasion of Panama =

1959 failed military invasion

- Part of Aftermath of the Cuban Revolution
Date	3 April – 1 May 1959
Location	Panama
Status	Cuban expedition failed

Belligerents
Cuba; MAR; MRJ-22; Panamanian guerrillas	Panama; United States; Guatemala

Commanders and leaders
Fidel Castro; César Vega; Roberto Arias; Enrique Morales †	Ernesto de la Guardia; Omar Torrijos

Strength
Invading Force: 94 personnel (Note: 85 soldiers, 5 explosive specialists and 5 medical support personnel); Local insurgents: Unknown; Reinforcement: 300 personnel (Note: Didn't arrive in Panama)	Unknown

Casualties and losses
90 captured 4 killed (Note: including two on 6 April and one non-combat fatality)	2+ wounded

The Cuban invasion of Panama was a military operation carried out in April 1959 in which Cuban troops, along with some Panamanian guerrillas, sought to initiate a revolution in Panama modeled after the Cuban example. The mission was led by Panamanian Enrique Morales in support of a coup attempt by Roberto Arias. It was the first effort by Cuba to export its revolution through guerrilla warfare and marked a turning point in how the United States and Latin American media and governments perceived Fidel Castro and the Cuban Revolution. The invasion also contributed to the emergence of guerrilla groups across Latin America, reflecting Cuba's broader strategy of revolutionary export during the Cold War.

== Background ==
During the Cold War, Cuba aligned itself internationally with socialist movements and offered military support to ideologically aligned resistance groups. Although Cuba's foreign military intervention officially began in 1966, Fidel Castro's ambitions were evident as early as 1959 following the Cuban Revolution.

== Events ==
=== Plot and preparation ===
In January 1959, Roberto Arias met with Fidel Castro, who agreed to support Arias with arms and personnel. On 3 April 1959, local guerrillas from the Revolutionary Action Movement, backed by Cuba, looted an armory and retreated into the mountains. The Panamanian National Guard launched a response the next day. By 6 April, the guardsmen engaged the rebels, resulting in two insurgents killed and two guardsmen—including Omar Torrijos—wounded. On 9 April 1959, another confrontation took place, which ended with the escape of the guerrillas who had been previously captured, although some were recaptured a few days later. Another clash occurred on 9 April, during which some previously captured guerrillas escaped, though many were soon recaptured. On 15 April, the Panamanian government denounced Cuba’s actions before the international community. Around 200 personnel had been trained in Pinar del Río, Cuba, under the supervision of Dermidio Escalona. A yacht carrying the invasion force departed from Batabanó on 19 April 1959. The group included 82 Cubans, 2 Panamanians (including Floyd Britton), and an American, under the leadership of Cuban commander César Vega. The group also included a doctor, four nurses, four bomb experts, and was heavily armed,

=== Invasion ===
The Cuban-led force arrived on Panamanian shores on 24 April 1959 to support a coup attempt against the government, marking Cuba's first overseas military action after the revolution, The coup was orchestrated by diplomat Roberto Arias, the nephew of former president Arnulfo Arias and husband of British ballerina Margot Fonteyn.

Landing in the Panamanian jungle on 25 April, the force lost its local commander, Enrique Morales, who drowned during the landing. The group split into smaller units to recruit local support before regrouping.

On 26 April, the Arias couple embarked on a fishing trip aboard their yacht The Nola, ordering fishermen to retrieve a buoy loaded with weapons. The fishermen reported the incident, and Arias attempted to flee by boarding the shrimp boat Elaine, while Fonteyn used the yacht as a decoy before turning herself in to authorities.

On 27 April, Colonel Bolívar Vallarino held a press conference to denounce the invasion and presented three captured invaders. By 28 April, those surrounded in Nombre de Dios requested repatriation to Cuba, but the Panamanian government demanded unconditional surrender. Fidel Castro publicly distanced himself from the invasion, calling it irresponsible.

On 30 April, 30 Panamanian guardsmen confronted the invaders but stood down to allow neutral observers access to the area. By then, the invaders were 20 miles from the Panama Canal, having marched 35 miles along the coast. Reports indicated 89 fighters on the ground, with 300 reinforcements possibly en route.

=== Failure of the invasion ===
Fonteyn was arrested and held for 24 hours before being deported to New York. The coup attempt was thwarted by the Panamanian National Guard, with support from the United States and Guatemala. On 1 May 1959, 87 invaders surrendered after negotiations with a committee from the Organization of American States (OAS), consisting of delegates from Brazil, the United States, Argentina, Costa Rica, and Paraguay. The surrender was reportedly in accordance with Castro's orders.

== Aftermath ==
The captured fighters were released and repatriated to Cuba one month later. Che Guevara later stated that Cuba exported revolutionary ideas, not revolutions themselves.

In 1959, Roberto Arias and Margot Fonteyn were charged with attempting to smuggle arms into Panama. Fonteyn confessed to British Ambassador Sir Ian Henderson during a prison visit, and the British Foreign Office agreed to keep her statement confidential. The British embassy arranged her release and transfer to New York City without disclosing to the United States government that she had been involved with Cuba in the plot. Arias took refuge in the Brazilian embassy of Panama for two months and arrived safely in Lima, Peru, the same day Fonteyn arrived in New York. Arias sought refuge in the Brazilian embassy and later escaped to Lima, Peru. Charges against both were eventually dropped.

Documents released by the British government in 2010 confirmed their involvement in the failed coup.

The failed invasion increased tensions between Cuba and the United States and fueled the rise of guerrilla movements throughout Latin America. It catalyzed the formation of the Latin American Solidarity Organization and later inspired groups like the Ñancahuazú Guerrilla and the Revolutionary Coordinating Junta.

== Sources ==
- Bowcott, Owen (28 May 2010). "Dame Margot Fonteyn: the ballerina and the attempted coup in Panama". The Guardian. London, England. Archived from the original on 28 February 2018.
- "A Panama Invasion: Hunt for fifty men". The Manchester Guardian. London, England. British United Press. 27 April 1959. p. 5 – via Newspapers.com.
- "On this day 22 April 1959: Dame Margot Fonteyn released from jail". London, England: BBC. 22 April 2008. Archived from the original on 8 December 2017.
- "Dame Margot Fonteyn 'Detained' by Panama Govt: Alleged Plot for Revolution (pt 1)". The Age. Melbourne, Victoria, Australia. Australian Associated Press. 22 April 1959. p. 1 – via Newspapers.com.
