= Le Spectre de la rose =

Ballet

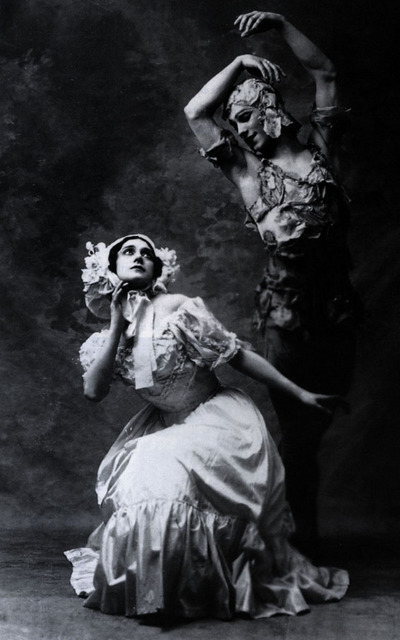
- Karsavina and Nijinsky, 1911
- Choreographer: Michel Fokine
- Music: Hector Berlioz's orchestration of Carl Maria von Weber's Aufforderung zum Tanz as L'Invitation à la Valse
- Libretto: Jean-Louis Vaudoyer
- Based on: Théophile Gautier's poem "Le Spectre de la rose"
- Premiere: 19 April 1911; Théâtre de Monte-Carlo
- Original ballet company: Diaghilev's Ballets Russes
- Characters: The Young Girl; The Rose
- Design: Léon Bakst
- Setting: The Young Girl's Bedroom, about 1830
- Created for: Tamara Karsavina; Vaslav Nijinsky
- Genre: Fantasy
- Type: Neo-Classical ballet

Le Spectre de la rose (The Spirit of the Rose) is a short ballet about a young girl who dreams of dancing with the spirit of a souvenir rose from her first ball. The ballet was written by Jean-Louis Vaudoyer who based the story on a verse by Théophile Gautier and used the music of Carl Maria von Weber's piano piece Aufforderung zum Tanz (Invitation to the Dance) as orchestrated by Hector Berlioz.

The ballet premiered in Monte Carlo on 19 April 1911, produced by the Ballets Russes ballet company. Michel Fokine was the choreographer and Léon Bakst designed the original Biedermeier sets and costumes. Nijinsky danced The Rose and Tamara Karsavina danced the Young Girl. It was a great success. Spectre became internationally famous for the spectacular leap Nijinsky made through a window at the ballet's end.

== Origin ==
In 1911, Ballets Russes producer Sergei Diaghilev hoped to present Nijinsky's ballet L'Après-midi d'un faune. It was not ready for the stage, so he needed another ballet to take its place. That ballet was the idea of writer Jean-Louis Vaudoyer. In 1910, he had sent an idea for a ballet to Ballets Russes set and costume designer Léon Bakst. His idea was based on "Le Spectre de la rose", a verse by Théophile Gautier, and Aufforderung zum Tanz, a work for piano by Carl Maria von Weber and orchestrated by Hector Berlioz in 1841. Diaghilev liked Vaudoyer's idea. He thought it could easily take the place of Faune. He put Vaudoyer's idea into development at once. Diaghilev liked the idea of a ballet based on Gautier's "Spectre" because it could be tied to the centennial of Gautier's birth.

== Synopsis ==
The curtain rises on a girl's bedroom. The Young Girl comes into the room dressed in a white bonnet and ball gown. She has returned to her home after her first ball. She holds a rose as a souvenir of the evening. She drops into a chair and falls asleep. The rose falls from her fingers to the floor. The Spirit of the Rose is seen at the window. He steps to the floor and nears The Young Girl. Still asleep, she rises and dances with him. He leads her back to the chair, kisses her, then leaps through the window and into the night. The Young Girl awakes and rises. She picks up the rose she dropped and kisses it. The curtain falls.

== Music ==
In 1819, Carl Maria von Weber wrote a work for piano called Aufforderung zum Tanz. He also wrote a program for this work about a young man and woman who meet, dance, and part at a ball. The quiet music at the opening of Aufforderung leads to some beautiful (and busy) waltz tunes before the work ends with the opening music. In 1841, Hector Berlioz orchestrated Aufforderung. This version of the music was used for a short ballet in Weber's opera Der Freischütz at the Paris Opéra. It was the Berlioz version of the original piano piece that was used for the ballet Le Spectre de la rose.

== Premiere ==
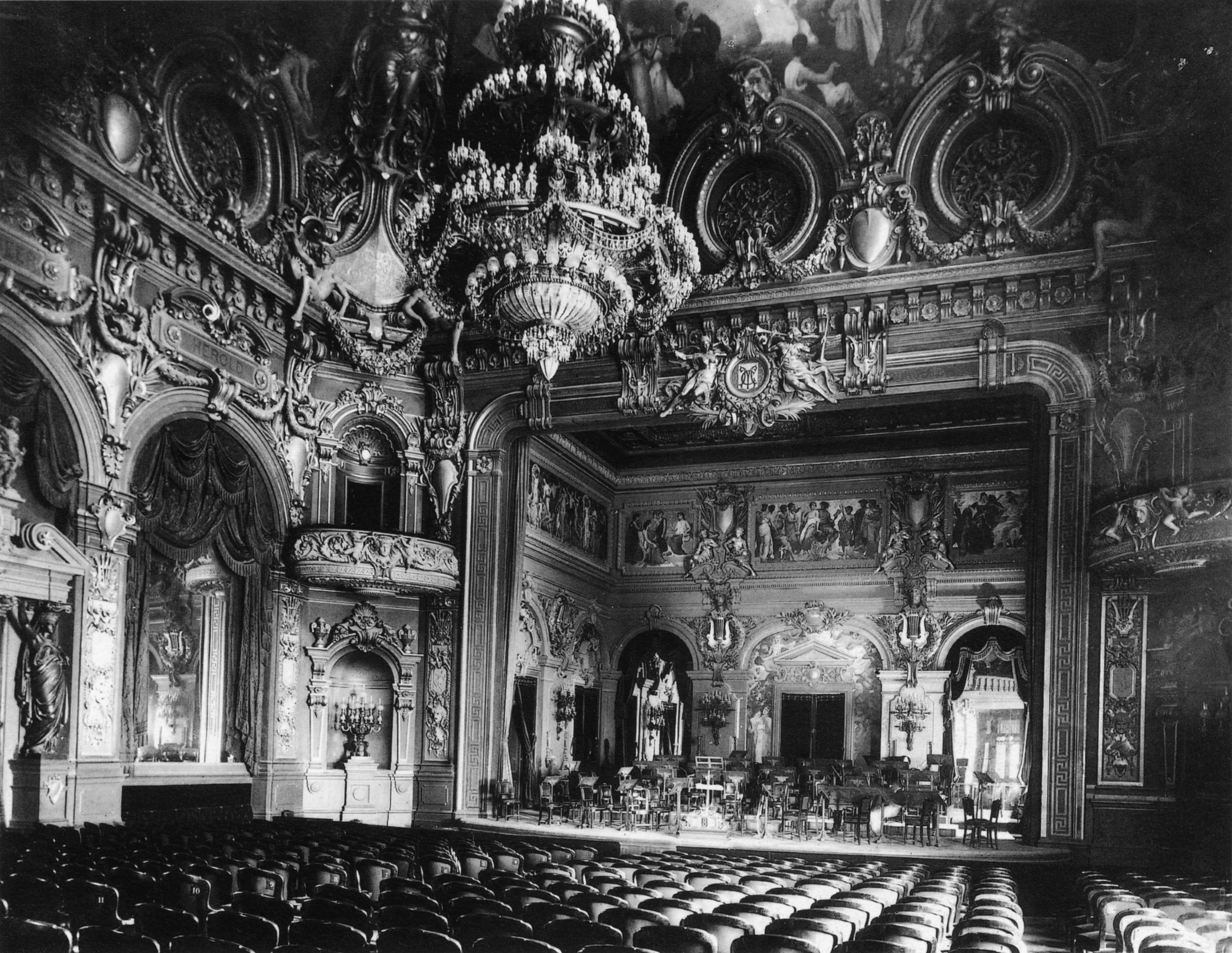
Interior of the Monte Carlo Casino, 1879. The Casino theatre later became the Opera House.

Spectre was premiered on 19 April 1911 by Diaghilev's Ballets Russes in the Théâtre de Monte Carlo, Monte Carlo. Tamara Karsavina danced The Young Girl and Nijinsky danced The Rose. Grace Robert writes that Spectre was an "immediate success". Diaghilev was surprised; he thought Spectre a trifle not worth notice, but the little ballet became one of the most loved productions of the Ballets Russes.

=== Dance ===
Michel Fokine completed the dance in three or four rehearsals. He later wrote that the ballet was almost an improvisation. Grace Robert writes in The Borzoi Book of Ballets that Spectre is a pas de deux but not the sort of pas de deux that looks back to complex 19th-century technique and virtuosity. Instead, it is a forward-looking, modern dance of continuous movement and expressiveness.

Fokine dropped the port de bras of classical ballet in designing the dances for Nijinsky. He used instead curving, tendril-like movements of the arms and fingers. Nijinsky became an androgynous character in this ballet, one showing masculine power in his legs and a feminine delicacy in his arms. Some of his gestures, Ostwalt writes in Nijinsky: A Leap into Madness, "lent a feminine aura" to the character.

=== Nijinsky's costume ===
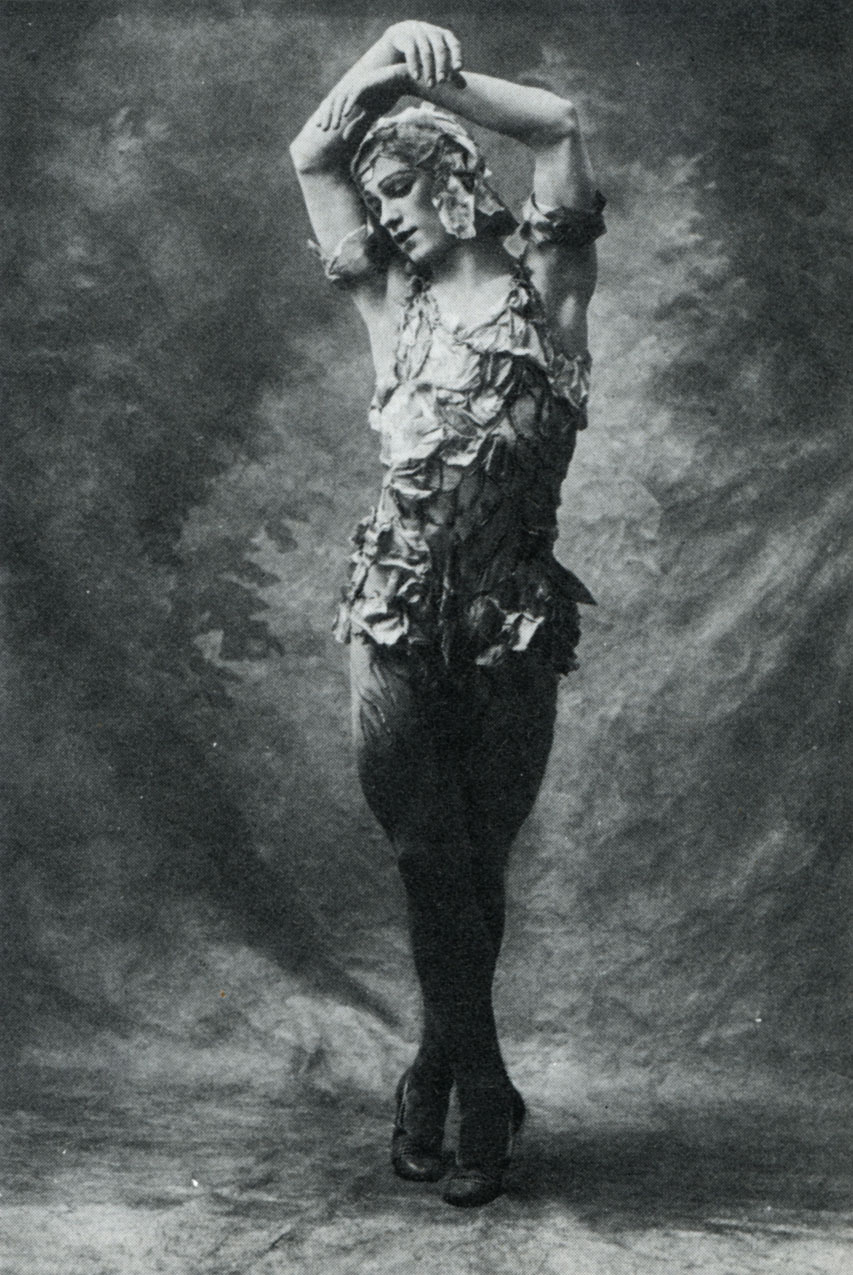
Nijinsky in the rose petal costume

Nijinsky's silk elastic costume was designed by Léon Bakst. The costume was covered with silk rose petals. Nijinsky was stitched into the costume for every show. After every show, the wardrobe mistress would touch up the petals with her curling iron.

Nijinsky's make-up was an important part of the costume design. Romula de Pulszky, later to be his wife, wrote that he looked like "a celestial insect, his eyebrows suggesting some beautiful beetle". Ostwald writes that Nijinsky's costume was like a ballerina's.

Sometimes, petals would become loose and fall to the stage floor. Nijinsky's servant Vasili would collect the petals and sell them as souvenirs. It was said that he built a large house called Le Château du Spectre de la Rose with the profits from the sale of the petals.

=== Nijinsky's leap ===
The ballet became famous for Nijinsky's leap through one of the two large windows at the back of the stage. Despite appearances to the contrary and Nijinsky's athletic grace and prowess, the height of the leap was an illusion. Nijinsky took five running steps from the middle of the stage and leapt through the window on the sixth step. The skirting board (base board) under the window was very low, giving the illusion that the leap was higher than it actually was. Behind the set, four men caught Nijinsky in the air and immediately shrouded him in warm towels. No one in the audience ever saw Nijinsky land, so the elaborate arrangements gave the impression that he soared on indefinitely. The illusion was helped by the conductor in the orchestra pit who held the penultimate chord. In doing so, the leap was given a sense of greater length and height.

== Other productions ==
Since the ballet's creation, many male dancers have interpreted the role of The Rose, but it is generally perceived that none have truly matched Nijinsky's brilliance, partly because the ballet had been specially designed to suit his particular talents. The Young Girl has been called "the forgotten woman of ballet", and, as time has passed, the part has become routine. By the middle of the 20th century, Spectre had become nothing but a stunt ballet: people paid only to see the leap through the window.

Spectre was one of the first ballets Rudolph Nureyev danced in the West after leaving Russia. This was for German television in 1961. He first danced The Rose on stage (24 times) in New York City for the Joffrey Ballet's Diaghilev program in 1979. Spectre was the last ballet Nureyev and Margot Fonteyn danced together. That was in June 1979, when the ballerina was 60. He danced The Rose in Paris in 1981 and 1982, and last danced the part in August 1987 at the London Coliseum with the Nancy Ballet.

The ballet was first seen in Australia in 1936 when it was part of the Monte Carlo Russian Ballet program. In 1962, Margot Fonteyn danced The Young Girl as part of her 1962 tour of Australia. In 2006, The Australian Ballet presented the ballet as one of three showing the work of Fokine.

== Tribute ==
A unique pink diamond discovered and cut in Moscow and valued by the Gemological Institute of America at a minimum of $60 million was named “Le Spectre de la Rose” as a tribute to a legendary Russian ballet miniature.
