= Jorge Suárez (pianist) =

Mexican Canadian pianist (born 1944)

Dr. Jorge Suárez
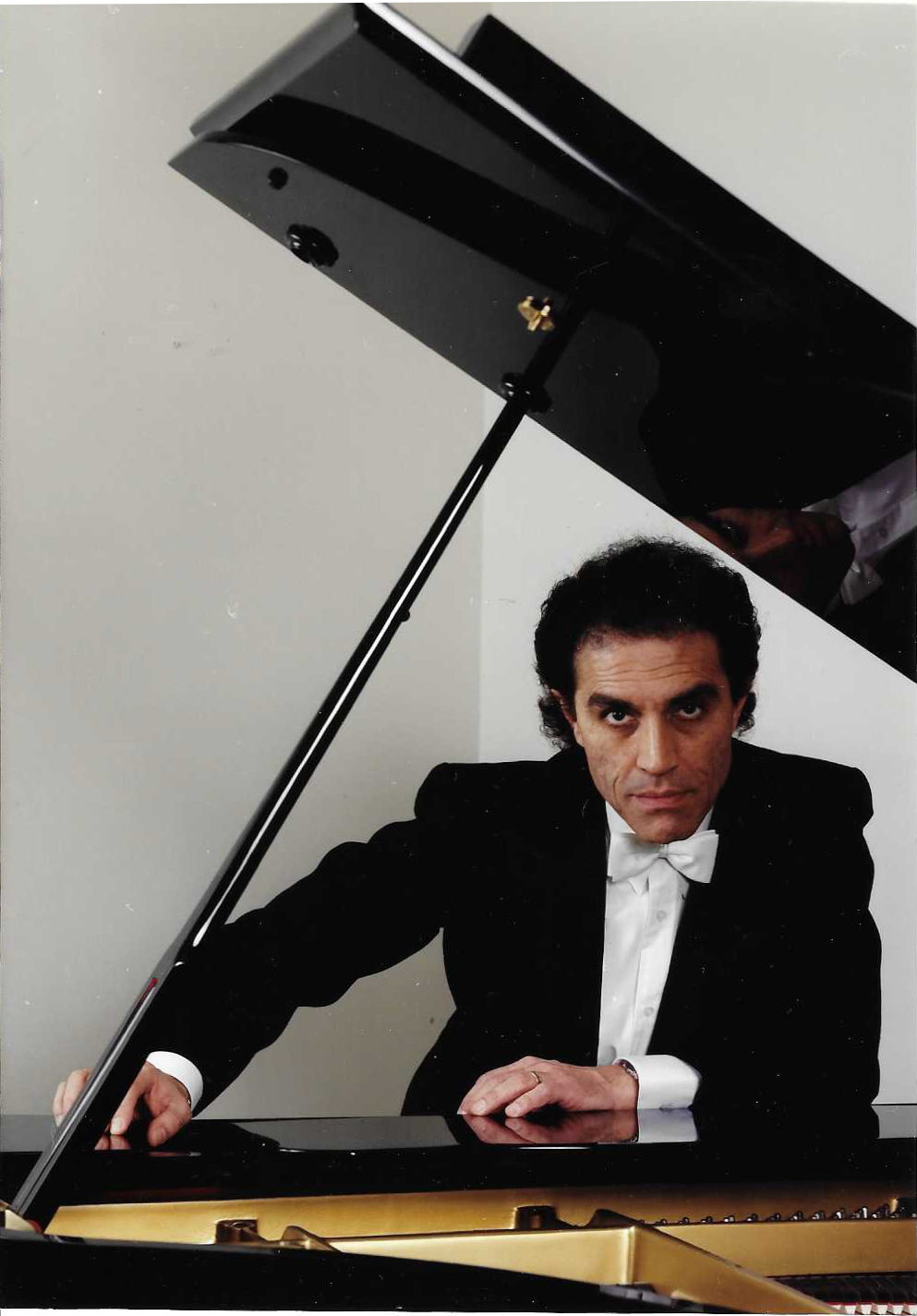
- Born: Jorge Eduardo Suárez Ángeles; January 26, 1944 (age 82); Mexico City
- Style: Classical
- Spouse: Rosemarie Peart
- Website: https://www.jorgesuarezpianist.com/

Jorge Suarez (born January 26, 1944) is a concert pianist with dual citizenship of both Canada and Mexico. He has lived in Canada since 1992.

His repertoire is both ample and diversified from more than one hundred composers (from the baroque to presently living composers), more than 500 major compositions (the famous and the seldom performed; for piano solo; piano solo and symphony orchestras; piano solo and chamber ensembles). Since his Concerto debut at age 9, he has performed at international festivals and halls as well as with multiple orchestras. He has also performed chamber works with eminent artists such as Bruno Giuranna, Leonid Kogan, Dimitry Markevitch, Ruggiero Ricci, Henryk Szeryng, his brother Manuel Suarez, and his former Trio Mexico – the first Trio to play in China after its reopening and receiver of the Highest Distinction of the Inter-American Music Council. He has also received the Congressional Certificate of Merit from the United States Congress (November 2, 1989). He has recorded for the radios and TVs of Europe, Asia, the Americas and more than 15 LP's & CD's.

== Biography ==
=== Early life ===
Jorge Suarez was born on January 26, 1944, in Mexico City. His parents were Pablo Suarez Diaz and Esperanza Angeles Mondragon. Pablo was a chemical engineer, composer of more than 50 popular songs, and son of MD Manuel Suarez, the first Chancellor of the University of Veracruz. Esperanza was a pianist who graduated from a private piano academy. Both parents were interested in having a music career, but the circumstances of the time did not allow that possibility. However, they had frequent home gatherings with friends where Esperanza played some classical piano pieces and sang Pablo's songs with him at the piano. Jorge has two brothers, concert violinist and conductor Manuel (1943–2003), and Pablo that, although he started playing several instruments from age 5, has a career in informatics.

=== Education ===
Jorge has a DMus degree from McGill University (Canada). He started his musical studies at seven with Dolores Morales, mother of world-renowned pianist and teacher Angelica Morales von Sauer. At age 11, Jorge continued his musical studies in Philadelphia, first at The New School of Music with Vladimir Sokoloff, and later, at 15, at Curtis Institute of Music with Eleanor Sokoloff. At 16, he studied four years at the Tchaikovsky Conservatory (Moscow), with Heinrich Neuhaus (teacher of Russian giants Richter and Gilels), Lev Naumov, and Sergey Dorensky.

He also studied at the University of Southern California (Los Angeles, 1971 Summer Term) with Rosina Lhévinne (teacher of Van Cliburn and many other famous pianists), and Daniel Pollack; at the 1974 International Ravel Academy (France) with Philippe Entremont, where he was selected to play Ravel's Concerto for the Left Hand with the Capitole Toulouse Orchestra under Michel Plasson; and two years at the Institute for Advanced Musical Studies (1974–75, school founded in Switzerland by Dimitry Markevitch) with John Ogdon (1st Prize, 1962 Tchaikovsky Competition), Dieter Weber, Ania Dorfmann (a renowned Juilliard School teacher), Asaif Bar-Lev, and Norman Shetler.

From age 12 to 20, during the time of his studies in Philadelphia and Moscow, he spent the summers in Mexico, to give annual solo recitals, concertos with orchestra, and duos with his brother, concert violinist Manuel Suarez. During those periods in Mexico, he studied with Guillermo Salvador.

In 1991 he married pianist Rosemarie Peart, "the love of his life" since 1969. In 1992 he moved to Canada.

== Repertoire ==
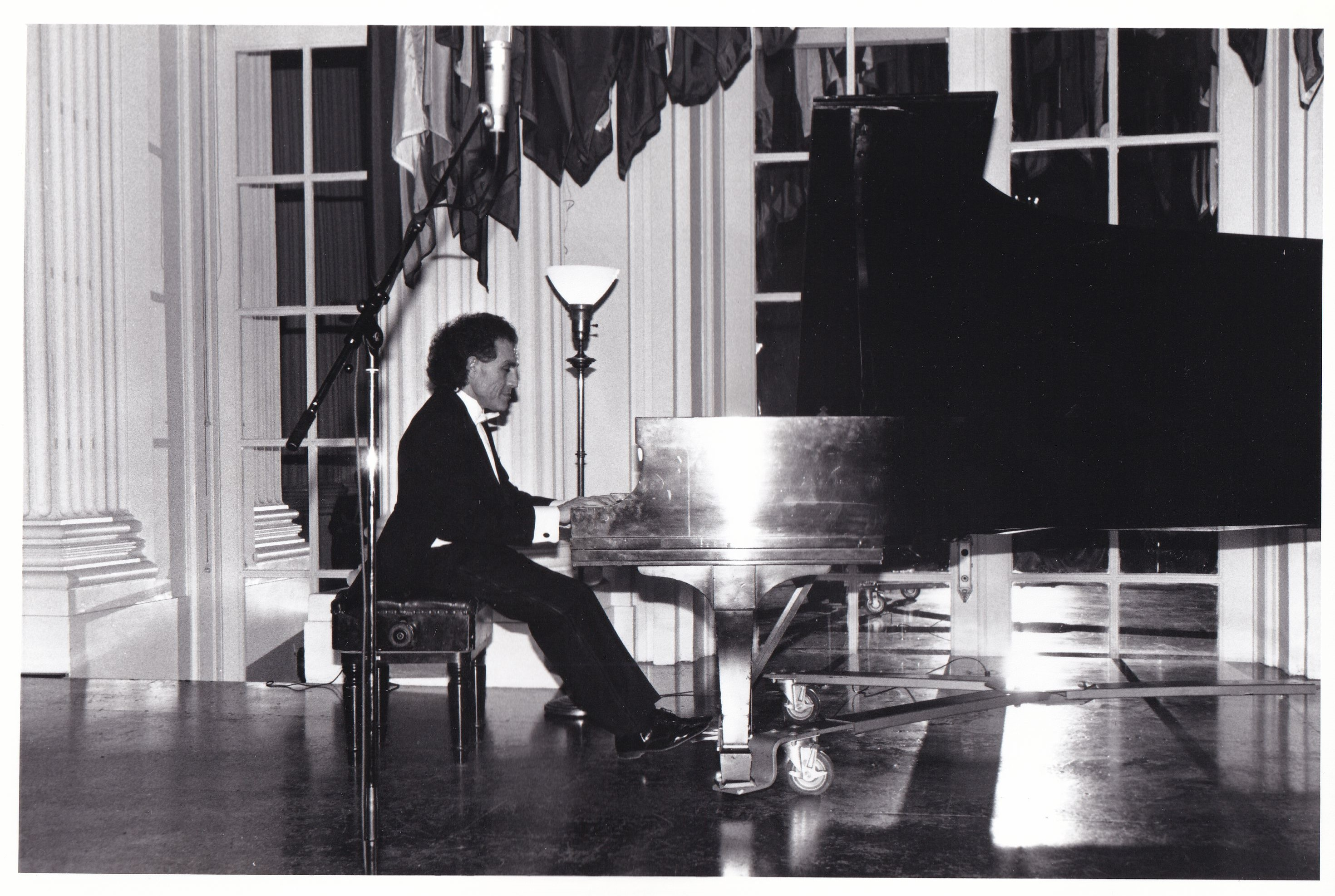
Performance at the Hall of the Americas, Organization of American States (OAS)

Besides the vast repertoire from the Baroque to contemporary, Jorge Suarez has also performed many seldom-played works, such as the Fantasies for piano and orchestra by Debussy and Tchaikovsky (and also the latter's Concertos 2 & 3), Liszt's Malédiction, Franck's Les Djinns, Montani's Concertino, and many major works by living or recent composers, especially those of the Americas. He has given the premiere and/or first recording of such works as Federico Ibarra's Concerto and Sonatas 2 & 5 (all also dedicated to Jorge); Blas Galindo's Sonata (also first recording); Rodolfo Halffter, all last major compositions (the last major one, Secuencia, also dedicated to Jorge, and 1st recording of Nocturne) and Concert Overture (first recording); Michael Matthews' Concerto (dedicated to Jorge); Martha Duncan's Isla Vista and The Sunken Garden; Eduardo Mata's Improvisaciones 2 (first recording).

== Other activities ==
At several international forums, Jorge Suarez has presented lectures, master classes, and scholarly writings on many musical, artistic and humanistic subjects, most published by prominent institutions. He has adjudicated at several competitions, including the International Competition of Musicology, Havana, Cuba, Casa de las Américas. He founded several musical organizations with other prominent musicians, including Euterpe, an organization, school, and scenic-concert producer for a holistic development through art (music, plastic arts, and theatre). He has written and promoted major musical projects for the general music development of society.

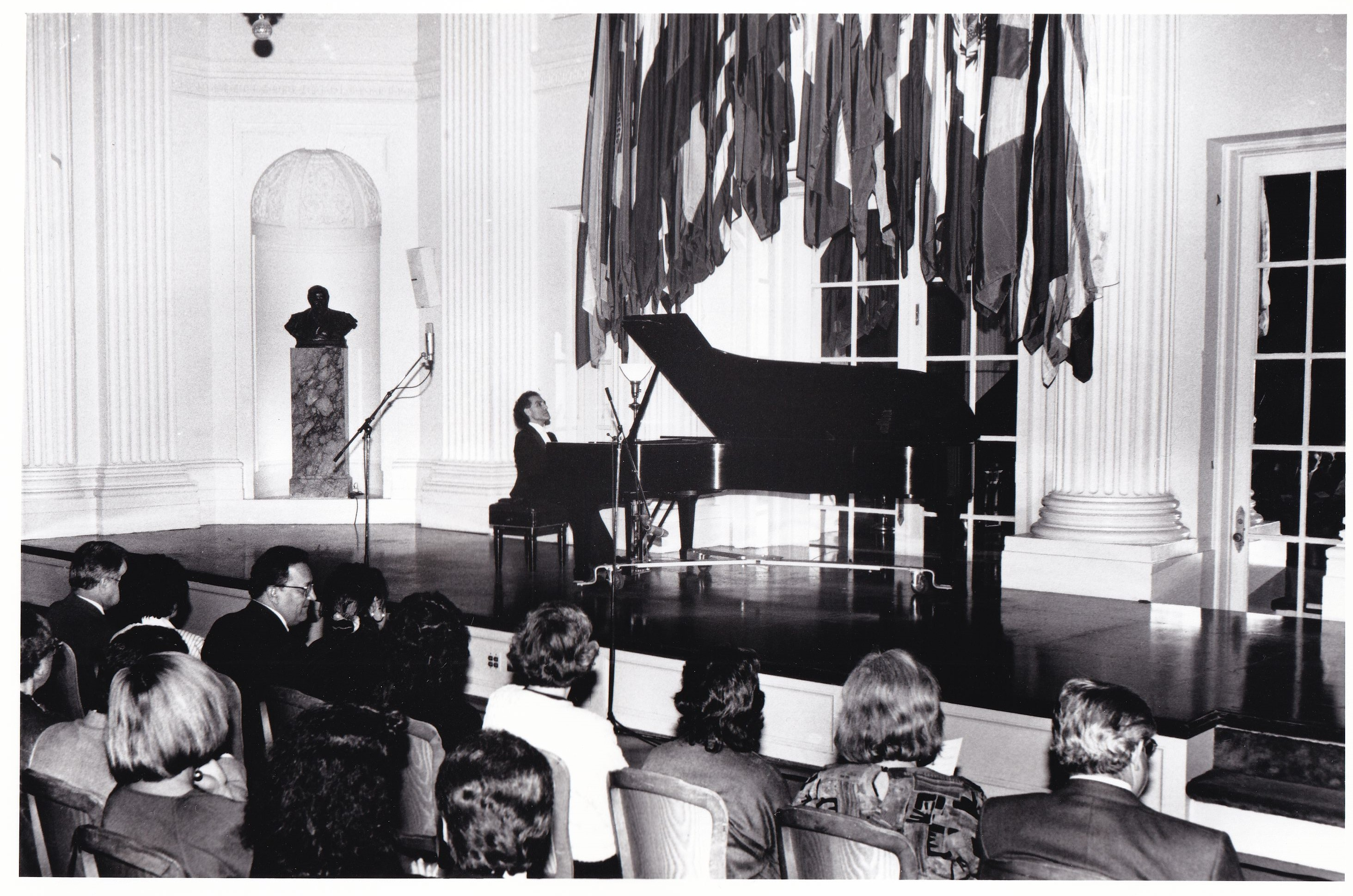
Jorge Suarez was awarded the Highest Distinction of the Inter-American Music Council of the Organization of American States at the Hall of the Americas, Washington, D.C.

He has been the Dean of the Escuela Nacional de Música, (1984–1992, National School of Music, now Faculty of Music of the National Autonomous University of Mexico, UNAM), one of the largest music-education institutions in the world with over 200 teachers and more than 2000 students, and has also been a professor at various major universities, including Queen's University (1994–1995) and the University of Manitoba (1996–1999) in Canada

== Publications ==
"Eficiencia en las habilidades psicomotrices de ejecución musical" ["Efficiency in Psychomotor Music-Performance Skills and its Development."] In SENTIR, PENSAR Y ACTUAR DE LA MÚSICA EN EL MÉXICO DEL SIGLO XXI, TOMO I. Zacatecas, México: Universidad Autónoma de Zacatecas, 2022, 159-177.

"Elementos y organización de la ejecución musical a primera vista." ["Elements and Organization of Music Sight-Performance."] In VIOLÍN, VIOLA, VIOLONCELLO Y PIANO: PROCESOS DE ENSEÑANZAS Y APRENDIZAJES. VOLUMEN I. Zacatecas, México: Universidad Autónoma de Zacatecas, 2020, 129-150.

"Colorística musical: Control y organización de la Calidad Sonora" ["Musical Coloristics: Context, Organization, and Elements of Sound Quality."] In VIOLÍN, VIOLA, VIOLONCELLO Y PIANO: PROCESOS DE ENSEÑANZA-APRENDIZAJE. VOLUMEN II. Zacatecas, México: Universidad Autónoma de Zacatecas, 2018, 143-166.

"Sistematización de Método y Estrategia en los Estudios Musicales." México: UNAM (National University) Cuadernos Interamericanos de Investigación en Educación Musical, No. 4, 2003, 31-48.

"Recursos ampliados de producción sonora en el piano." Mexico City: pauta, Nos. 75-76, 2000, 181-203.

"Toma de decisiones, Un enfoque integral." [Decision Taking: An Integral Approach]. Mexico: UNAM (National University), Congreso Universitario, 1990. Rev. Winnipeg, MB, 1999.

"Cuatro músicos." [Four Musicians.] In Cincuenta años del exilio español en la UNAM. Mexico: UNAM (National University), 1991, 99-108.

"Educación artística integral Euterpe' ["Euterpe Integral Artistic Education"]. In 1 LA EDUCACIÓN MUSICAL INFANTIL EN MÉXICO: ANTOLOGÍA DE MÉTODOS Y EXPERIENCIAS. Mexico: INBA (National Fine Arts Institute). 1987, 149-166.

== International congress presentations ==
"Eficiencia en las habilidades psicomotrices de ejecución musical y su desarrollo." ["Efficiency in Psychomotor Music-Performance Skills and its Development."] Presented at Cima y Sima 2018, México City.

"Correlación de la música con otras disciplinas." ["Correlation of Music with other Disciplines."] Presented at Cima y Sima 2012, Zacatecas, México.

"Leer Entre Líneas Musicales 1." ["Reading Between the Musical Lines 1."] Presented at Cima y Sima 2005, Zacatecas, México.

Interpretación estética-emotiva." ["Aesthetic-Emotive Performance."] Presented at Cima y Sima 2003, Morelia, México.

"Control and Organization of Sound Quality." Presented at ISMA (International Symposium on Musical Acoustics), 2002, Mexico City.

== Discography ==
=== LPs and albums ===
Rodolfo Halffter	Obertura Concertante Para Piano Y Orquesta, Op. 5

(Label: RCA Victor – MRS 020)

Tapia Colman	Sonata "El Afilador" For Violin And Piano
Tapia Colman	Trio Prehispanico Para Violin, Cello And Piano
Tapia Colman	Secuencias Nucleicas For Piano Alone (1973)
Tapia Colman	Sonata For Cello And Piano (1959)

(Label: Centro Independiente De Investigaciones Musicales Y Multimedia (CIIMM) – MA-487)

Rodolfo Halffter	Segunda Sonata Para Piano, Op. 20
Rodolfo Halffter	Homenaje A Arturo Rubinstein, (Nocturnes para piano), Op. 36

(Label: Ediciones Interamericanas De Musica – OEA-018)

"Anécdotas", Composed By, Producer, Design, Coordinator – Jorge Cordoba Valencia

Improvisaciones No. 2 Para Dos Pianos Y Cuerda, Written By – Eduardo Mata

=== CDs ===
Trio Mexico - "Catan, Sandi, Muench, Lavista, Lavalle", MacTrax Producciones, Mexico 1992.

Trio Mexico - "Ponce, Enriquez, Kuri-Aldana", MacTrax, Mexico 1992.

"Federico Ibarrra - Diez Años de Música de Cámara"

Jorge Suarez - "Pianorama Mexico Vol.1", ℗© 1995 Bellas Artes International. All rights Reserved.

== Critics/Reviews ==
- Peter Clausen from the Berliner Zeitung described Suarez as "International top class master" with "Supreme technique", at the Berliner Ensemble.
- Suarez's performance (Pianist, Trio Mexico) at Carnegie Hall (1977) was "Propelled by romantic exuberance.".
- Kate Rivers from the Washington Post considered Suarez's performance at the Hall of The Americas: "warmly evocative readings"
- The London Free Press regarded Suarez's playing of Prokofiev's Third Piano Concerto "superb, technically and artistically" ... "his impeccable playing seemed to spur the orchestra" and "The dazzling finale of the piece brought most of the audience to its feet."
- The Telegraph-Journal considered Jorge Suarez's performance of Liszt's Malédiction,"required a command of the piano and a mastery of its resources that only a prodigious talent such as he possesses can unleash."
- Suarez's performance with the Hamilton Philharmonic Orchestra garnered praise as "a remarkable virtuoso".
- The Hunan Daily Newspaper praised Jorge Suarez performance: "Highly-talented and complimented by everyone."
