= Roberto Arias =

Panamanian politician (1918–1989)

- Born: Roberto Emilio Arias; 26 October 1918
- Died: 22 November 1989 (aged 71)
- Other name: Tito
- Education: The Peddie School, St. John's College, Cambridge
- Occupations: Lawyer, diplomat, journalist
- Spouse: Dame Margot Fonteyn (m. 1955)
- Children: 3

Roberto Emilio Arias (26 October 1918 – 22 November 1989), known as "Tito", was a Panamanian international lawyer, diplomat and journalist who was the husband of ballerina Dame Margot Fonteyn. Arias was from a prominent Panamanian political family, whose members had reached the Presidency four times; amongst them his father Harmodio Arias.

== Early life ==
Born in 1918, Arias was educated at the Peddie School in Hightstown, New Jersey, United States, and at St John's College, Cambridge, England. From 1942 to 1946, he edited his family's newspaper, La Hora.

== Marriage to Fonteyn ==
In February 1955 while in Paris, Arias married English ballerina Margot Fonteyn, after divorcing his first wife, with whom he had three children. After his marriage, Arias was appointed as Panama's ambassador to the United Kingdom. In 1959, he and Fonteyn were charged with attempted gun-smuggling from their yacht off the coast of Panama and he was accused of fomenting a revolt against President Ernesto de la Guardia Jr. She was immediately deported to England; Arias took refuge in the Brazilian Embassy for two months and was then given safe conduct out of the country. Eventually the charges were dropped and, after a governmental change, the couple were permitted to return to Panama. Documents released in March 2010 by the British government showed that they were both involved in the unsuccessful coup attempt.

== Politics ==
In May 1964, Arias was elected to the National Assembly, his first venture into active politics. Two months later, he was shot in an argument with a friend and former political associate, Alberto Jiménez, on a street corner in a suburb of Panama City. It was widely rumored that the shooting was a result of an affair that Arias was having with Jimenez's wife. Arias was treated for 18 months in British hospitals and spent the rest of his life as a quadriplegic, using a wheelchair. One of the reasons Fonteyn continued to dance so late in life was to pay Arias' enormous medical bills. Colette Clark, a close friend who worked with Fonteyn on Royal Academy of Dance galas, said:

People said it was such a tragedy, his being shot. Of course it wasn't a tragedy, because she got what she wanted. Someone to look after and love and lavish with all the devotion and strength of her marvellous character.

== Personal life and death ==
During Fonteyn's absence from Panama on tour as a ballerina, a socialite named Anabella Vallarino would move into the house as his shadow wife and move out again before Fonteyn's return. On the day of Arias' death on 22 November 1989, Vallarino committed suicide by swallowing a bottle of chlorine, and the two were buried on the same day.

In addition to Fonteyn, Arias was survived by two daughters, Querube Brillembourg and Rosita Vallarino; a son, Roberto Arias; two brothers, Harmodio and Gilberto; a sister, Rosario de Galindo, and six grandchildren.
