= Kyra Nijinsky =

Austrian ballet dancer (1914–1998)

Kyra Vaslavovna Nijinsky (19 June 1914 – 1 September 1998) was a ballet dancer of Polish and Hungarian ancestry, with a Russian dance and cultural heritage. She was the daughter of Vaslav Nijinsky and the niece of Bronislava Nijinska. In the 1930s she appeared in ballets mounted by Ida Rubinstein, Max Reinhardt, Marie Rambert, Frederick Ashton, Antony Tudor.

Her father Vaslav (1889–1950) was a world-renowned dancer with the Ballets Russes in Paris. Her aunt Bronia (1891–1972) also excelled in dance and was a leading choreographer, initially with Ballets Russes. Her mother Romola de Pulszky was a socialite and author. Romola's mother, Kyra's grandmother, was Emilia Márkus, a popular Hungarian actress.

Kyra was born to Romola and Vaslav in Vienna.

== Life and career ==
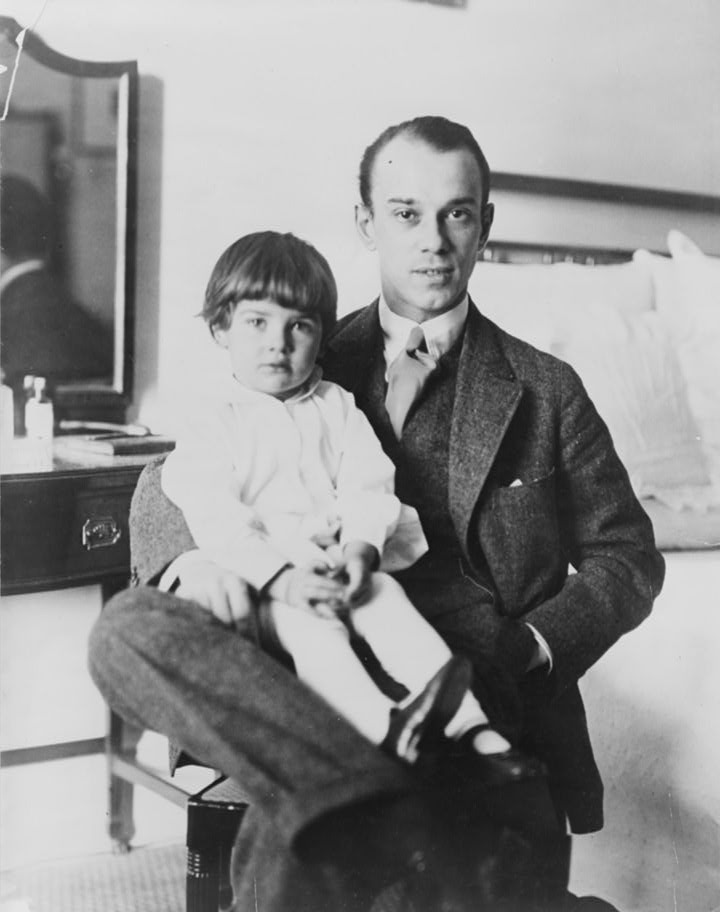
Kyra and her father Vaslav Nijinsky, c. 1916.

During Kyra's earliest years she delighted in her father's love and affection. By 1917, his mental illness ended his career. Kyra's family became chaotic, unhappy, and distant. With her father living in institutions, her mother sent her and her younger sister Tamara to boarding schools. Kyra's resemblance to her father Vaslav was remarkable, 'uncanny'. After taking early dance lessons (both professional and from her father and her aunt), she chose it as her career. Her mother disapproved. An American woman volunteered her early support.

While living alone in Berlin in 1931, Kyra began dancing in Ida Rubinstein's ballet company, directed by her aunt Bronia. She was next in a Max Reinhardt production of Offenbach's Tales of Hoffmann, choreographed by Bronislava Nijinska, with dancer Anton Dolin. Backstage, she became a close friend of another dancer Vera Zorina, who later wrote about her, "Kyra came from an exotic, unhappy world."

Kyra looked extraordinarily like her father. Her face was beautiful, Slavic, with high cheek bones and green eyes. She had the same rather thick neck as her father and held her head in the same way, tilted in a slightly suspicious manner.

In London she appeared in a Cochran review, Streamline. She studied with Nicolai Legat, a Russian ballet master. Later in Paris she would study with Lubov Egorova, a former ballerina in Diaghilev's company. Kyra and her mother Romola, also then in London, were apparently incompatible. They disagreed about the choice of living situations. It prompted Kyra to pack up and leave for Sweden where she danced at a cabaret. "She had led a nomadic life."

Marie Rambert latter recruited Kyra for her London company Ballet Rambert. There Kyra performed a central role in choreographer Frederick Ashton's Mephisto Valse. She also danced the part of the young girl in Le Spectre de la rose and of a nymph in L'Après-midi d'un faune, ballets in which her father Vaslav had either famously danced, or both choreographed and danced. Antony Tudor, for his new ballet The Planets, cast her as the Mortal, born under the sway of the mystic figure Neptune, so that she longed to unite herself with the Infinite. About Kyra critic Arnold Haskell wrote in 1935, "She is a dancer who understands, whether instinctively or otherwise, how to use dancing in order to express her emotions." She had a compelling presence.

On 20 April 1936, at the Coronation Church in Budapest, Kyra married Igor Markevitch, a Ukrainian composer and conductor who had been with Diaghilev's Ballets Russes during the late 1920s. He'd been compared to Stravinsky to the latter's discomfort. Kyra discontinued dancing. She and Igor had one child, a son Vaslav (20 January 1937 – 12 January 2024), yet eventually they divorced. Igor, who remarried, raised the boy. Drawn to the arts, Vaslav Markevitch became a painter.

Until 1958, Kyra lived in Rome where she worked as an interpreter in a fashion shop on Via Condotti. Then she moved to San Francisco. She had entered as a lay member the Franciscan Order. In the 1981 drama documentary She Dances Alone, she played herself. The film, directed by Robert Dornhelm, offers a view of her life, her pursuit of a career in dance.

== Description ==
Ballerina Margot Fonteyn described meeting Kyra in San Francisco in 1951.

We also met Nijinsky's daughter, Kyra, who is fascinating. Sturdily built and full of exuberance, she has the most engaging smile and what must be her father's eyes, of an unusual grey-green, or is it green-brown? She is an artist and uses bright colours. Her father is a frequent subject, but I noticed all her paintings show him in ballet roles, never as himself. When she was describing a Russian dance she made a momentary gesture of her right arm across her brow, and I could see Nijinsky exactly. There was something in her movement and her face that expressed all there is to say about dancing in that one instant, and I can never forget it.

== Bibliography ==
- Nancy Van Norman Baer, Bronislava Nijinska. A dancer's legacy (Fine Arts Museum of San Francisco 1986).
- Margot Fonteyn, Autobiography (New York: Knopf 1976).
- Vicente García Márquez, The Ballets Russes (New York: Knopt 1990).
- Lucy Moore, Nijinsky (New York: Profile Books 2013, 2014).
- Bronislava Nijinska, Early Memoirs (New York: Holt Rinehart Winston 1981).
- Romola Nijinsky, Nijinsky (New York: Simon and Schuster 1934; reprint Pocket Books 1972).
- Tamara Nijinsky, Nijinsky and Romola (London: Bachman & Turner 1991).
- Peter Ostwald, Nijinsky. A leap into madness (Secaucus: Lyle Stuart 1991).
- Nancy Reynolds and Malcom McCormick, No Fixed Point. Dance in the twentieth century (Yale University 2003).
- Vera Zorina, Zorina (New York: Farar Straus Giroux 1986).
  - Lynn Garafola and Nancy Van Norman Baer, editors, The Ballets Russes and its World (Yale University 1999).
  - Horst Koegler, The Concise Oxford Dictionary of Ballet ([1972], Oxford University 1977).

Articles, videos

- Nadine Meisner, "Obituary: Kyra Nijinsky", in The Independent, Oct. 21, 1998. Accessed: 2016-09-10.
- Klaudia Zelazowska, "Oswald Birley, Portrait of Kyra Nijinsky, a dancer who understands" in Daily Art Magazine, Mar. 11, 2018. Accessed: 2018-04-15. Includes: painting and photographs of Kyra, video of film She dances alone.
  - She Dances Alone (1981), at IMDb website, Feb. 18, 1982. Accessed: 2017-06-13. See Zelazowska above.
  - "Kyra Nijinska" at Dutch website: mijnstambomen. Accessed 2018.4.15. Her last name in Polish style (or Russian) would have the feminine ending 'ska'; the masculine is 'ski'. Includes photographs of Kyra in ballet costumes.
- Margot Fonteyn, interviewer, "Kyra Nijinsky interviewed about her father", JRH Films at youtube.com. Accessed 2018-04-15.
