= L'envol d'Icare =

L'Envol d'Icare (The Flight of Icarus) is a score written (but never performed) as a ballet by the Ukrainian composer Igor Markevitch in 1932–33. It is notable for featuring groups of instruments tuned a quarter-tone above and below the rest of the orchestra, and for its use of polyrhythms.

== History ==
The work was intended as part of a ballet, with choreography by Serge Lifar. Markevitch wrote the initial sketches during a holiday spent at Cap Ferrat in summer 1932. Lifar was initially positive about the music when he first heard it towards the end of that year, but then cooled; he concluded that, "the music was admirable, the idea of its union with dance seductive, but I had a clear sense that it would be impossible for me to bring my rhythm into accord with that of Markevitch."

Instead, Lifar agreed to a concert performance of the work, on Monday, 26 June 1933, under Roger Désormière. The composer started work on a version for two pianos and three percussion the same year, and reworked the orchestral version as Icare in 1943, removing the altered tuning and some of the rhythmic complexities.

At last in 1935 Lifar choreographed his ballet without music, using the rhythm produced by dancers only. It was renewed for Original Ballet Russe Australian tour in 1939.

== Movements ==
The work is in seven movements, lasting a total of approximately 27 minutes.

1. Prélude
2. Jeux des Adolescents (Eveil de la Connaissance) (Games of the Adolescents (Awakening Knowledge))
3. Icare attrape deux colombes... il étudie leur vol (Icarus traps two doves... he studies their flight)
4. Icare se fait fixer des ailes aux épaules: il essaye à voler (Icarus has wings fixed to his shoulders: he attempts flight)
5. L'Envol d'Icare (The Flight of Icarus)
6. Où l'on apprend la chute d'Icare (Where news of Icarus's fall is received)
7. La Mort d'Icare (Icarus's Death)
