= Igor Markevitch =

Russian conductor and composer (1912–1983)

Igor Markevitch (photo with dedication)

Igor Borisovich Markevitch (Note: Russian: Игорь Борисович Маркевич, romanized: Igor Borisovich Markevich; Ukrainian: Ігор Борисович Маркевич, romanized: Ihor Borysovych Markevych.) (27 July 1912 – 7 March 1983) was a Russian (Note: Attributed to the following references:) composer and conductor who studied and worked in Paris and became a naturalized Italian and French citizen in 1947 and 1982 respectively. He was commissioned in 1929 for a piano concerto by impresario Sergei Diaghilev of the Ballets Russes.

Markevitch settled in Italy during World War II. After the war, he moved to Switzerland. He had an international conducting career from there. He was married twice and had three sons and two daughters.

== Early life ==
He was born in Kiev in the Russian Empire (present-day Kyiv, Ukraine) into a family of Ukrainian Cossack starshiny, who were ennobled in the 18th century. His great-grandfather, Andrey Markevitch, was a state secretary during the reign of Alexander II of Russia, actual privy councilor in St. Petersburg, and co-founder of the Russian Musical Society. Igor was the son of pianist Boris Markevitch and Zoia Pokhitonova (daughter of painter Ivan Pokhitonov). The family moved to France in 1914 when he was two years old. They moved again to Switzerland in 1916, during World War I, because of his father's failing health (he later died of tuberculosis). The French pianist Alfred Cortot recognized the boy's talent. He advised him at age 14 in 1926 to go to Paris for training in both composition and piano at the École Normale de Musique de Paris, where he studied piano under Cortot and composition under Nadia Boulanger.

== Career ==
Markevitch gained important recognition in 1929 when choreographer-impresario Sergei Diaghilev discovered him and commissioned a piano concerto from him. In addition, Diaghilev invited him to collaborate on a ballet with Boris Kochno, a dancer and librettist. In a letter to the London Times, Diaghilev hailed Markevitch as the composer who would put an end to "a scandalous period of music ... of cynical-sentimental simplicity". The ballet project came to an end with Diaghilev's death on 19 August 1929, but Markevitch's compositions were accepted by the publisher Schott.

He produced at least one major work per year during the 1930s. He was rated among the leading contemporary composers of the time, even to the extent of being hailed as "the second Igor", after Igor Stravinsky. Markevitch collaborated on the ballet score Rébus with Léonide Massine in 1931; and L'Envol d'Icare in 1932 with Serge Lifar. Neither was staged, but both scores were performed in concert. L'Envol d'Icare, based on the legend of the fall of Icarus, which Markevitch recorded in 1938 conducting the Belgian National Orchestra, was especially radical, introducing quarter-tones in both woodwinds and strings. (In 1943 he revised the work under the title Icare, eliminating the quarter tones and simplifying the rhythms and orchestration.) Béla Bartók once described Markevitch as "...the most striking personality in contemporary music..." and claimed him as an influence on his own creative work. An independent version of L'Envol d'Icare for two pianos and percussion, which Bartók heard, is believed to have influenced the latter's own Sonata for 2 Pianos and Percussion.

Markevitch continued composing as war approached, but in October 1941, not long after completing his last original work, the Variations, Fugue and Envoi on a Theme of Handel for piano, he fell seriously ill. After recovering, he decided to give up composition and focus exclusively on conducting. His last compositional projects were the revision of L'Envol d'Icare and arrangements of other composers' music. His version of J. S. Bach's Musikalisches Opfer (Musical Offering) is especially notable.

He had débuted as a conductor at age 18 with the Royal Concertgebouw Orchestra. After presiding at the Dutch premiere of Rébus, Markevitch had studied conducting with Pierre Monteux and Hermann Scherchen. As a conductor, he was much admired for his interpretations of the French, Russian and Austro-German repertory, and of twentieth-century music in general.

He settled in Italy, and during the Second World War was active in the partisan movement. He married and settled in Switzerland in 1947 following the war. He pursued his conducting career worldwide. He became permanent conductor of the Orchestre Lamoureux in Paris in the 1950s, conducted the Spanish RTVE Orchestra in 1965, the London Symphony Orchestra in 1966 and was also permanent conductor of the Monte-Carlo Philharmonic Orchestra.

In 1970, after ignoring his own compositions for nearly 30 years, Markevitch began to conduct his own music frequently, triggering its slow revival. His last concert was in Kiev, his birthplace. He died suddenly from a heart attack in Antibes on 7 March 1983, after a concert tour in Japan and Russia.

== Family ==
His great-great-grandfather, Mykola Markevych, was a Ukrainian historian, ethnographer, composer and poet. His great-grandfather, Andriy Markevitch, was an activist, ethnographer, lawyer, philanthropist, and musician. His maternal grandfather was well-known painter Ivan Pokhitonov (1850–1923). His brother, Dimitry Markevitch, became a noted musicologist and cellist.

The Ukrainian Markevitch (also spelled in Polish as Markiewicz) family is believed to have originated 300 years ago from a common paternal ancestor and his wife. Their ethnicity is disputed as Polish, Ukrainian, or Serbian, as the patronymic name is widespread among central European peoples.

On 20 April 1936, in Budapest, Markevitch married Kyra Nijinsky (19 June 1914 – 1 September 1998), daughter of the great ballet dancer Vaslav Nijinsky and his wife Romola de Pulszky. They had a son, Vaslav Markevitch (20 January 1937 – 12 January 2024), before they divorced.

Markevitch married his second wife, Donna Topazia Caetani (1921–1990), in Lausanne on 22 July 1947; she was the only child of Don Michelangelo Caetani dei Duchi di Sermoneta and his wife, the former Cora Antinori. Cora Caetani ran the boutique of Jansen, the Paris decorating firm. Their son, Oleg Caetani (b. 1956), became chief conductor and artistic director of the Melbourne Symphony Orchestra in Australia. They also had two daughters together: Allegra (b. 1950) and Natalia (Nathalie, born 1951), and another son, Timour Markevitch (1960–1962).

== Works ==
=== Compositions ===
==== Stage ====
- Rébus, ballet (1931)
- L'Envol d'Icare, ballet (1932); recomposed as Icare (1943)

==== Orchestral/Concertante ====
- Sinfonietta in F major (1928-9)
- Piano Concerto (1929)
- Concerto Grosso (1930)
- Partita, for piano and small orchestra (1930–31)
- Cinéma-Ouverture (1931)
- Hymnes (1932–33)
- Petite Suite, d'après Schumann, for small orchestra (1933)
- Cantique d'Amour (1936)
- Le Nouvel Âge (1937)
- Le Bleu Danube, valse de concert on themes by Johann Strauss (1944)
- The Musical Offering, BWV 1079 by Johann Sebastian Bach, arranged for triple orchestra (1949–50)

==== Vocal/Choral ====
- Cantate, for soprano, male chorus & orchestra (1929–30) (text by Jean Cocteau)
- Psaume, for soprano and small orchestra (1933)
- Le Paradis Perdu, oratorio (1934–35) (text by Markevitch after John Milton)
- Trois Poèmes, for high voice and piano (1935) (texts by Cocteau, Plato, Goethe)
- La Taille de l'Homme, 'concert inachevé' for soprano and 12 instruments (1938–39, unfinished, but Part I complete and performable)
- Lorenzo il Magnifico, sinfonia concertante for soprano and orchestra (1940) (texts by Lorenzo de Medici)
- 6 Songs of Mussorgsky, arranged for voice and orchestra (1945)

==== Chamber/Instrumental ====
- Noces, suite for piano (1925)
- Sérénade, for violin, clarinet and bassoon (1931)
- Galop, for 8 or 9 players (1932)
- Stefan le Poète, 'Impressions d'Enfance', pour piano (1939–40)
- Variations, Fugue et Envoi on a Theme of Handel, for piano (1941)

=== Theory ===
- Die Sinfonien von Ludwig van Beethoven: historische, analytische und praktische Studien (The Symphonies of Beethoven: Historical, Analytical, and Practical Studies) — published by Edition Peters, Leipzig, 1982

Cultural offices
Preceded by Jean Martinon	Principal Conductors, Orchestre Lamoureux; 1957–1961	Succeeded by Jean-Baptiste Mari
