= An Evening with the Royal Ballet =

1963 British documentary film

- Directed by: Anthony Havelock-Allan; Anthony Asquith
- Starring: Margot Fonteyn; Rudolf Nureyev; David Blair
- Edited by: Richard Marden; James Clark
- Music by: Frédéric Chopin; Adolphe Adam; Maurice Ravel; Pyotr Ilyich Tchaikovsky
- Distributed by: British Home Entertainment
- Release date: 1963
- Running time: 85 minutes
- Country: United Kingdom

An Evening with the Royal Ballet is a 1963 British documentary film produced by British Home Entertainment for the Royal Ballet company.

The film contains excerpts from various ballet composers as conducted and re-arranged by John Lanchbery. It was filmed at the Royal Opera House under the direction of Ninette de Valois.

== Synopsis ==
The film's opening credits were accompanied by the excerpt from the final act of Swan Lake. The film included four parts, with an eight-minute encore of Le Corsaire.

=== Les Syphides ===
The first part of the short ballet piece called Les Sylphides by Frédéric Chopin, then re-orchestrated by Roy Douglas into canonical order:

1. Prelude in A major, Op. 28, No. 7 (also transcribed in A♭ major)
2. Nocturne in A♭ major, Op. 32, No. 2
3. Waltz in G♭ major, Op. 70, No. 1 (also transcribed in G major)
4. Mazurka in D major, Op. 33, No. 2
5. Mazurka in C major, Op. 33, No. 3
6. Prelude in A major, Op. 28, No. 7
7. Waltz in C♯ minor, Op. 64, No. 2
8. Grande valse brillante in E♭ major, Op. 18

This was the first dual role of Margot Fonteyn and Rudolf Nureyev, during the 1962 production was choreographed by Michel Fokine.

=== Le Corsaire ===
In the second part of 'pas de deux' from Le Corsaire by Adolphe Adam, Riccardo Drigo and others, choreographed by Nureyev himself during the 1962 production.

This was the second dual role featuring Nureyev and Fonteyn.

=== La valse ===
The third segment from La valse by Maurice Ravel, and choreographed by Frederick Ashton during the 1958 production, as Ravel noted:

Through whirling clouds couples of waltzers are faintly distinguished. The clouds disappear gradually; a huge ballroom is seen peopled with waltzing couples.

— Maurice Ravel

This scene were couples dancing in the ballroom, while male dancers were dressed in white ties, and female dancers were also dressed ball gowns.

=== Aurora's Wedding ===
The last segment from the third act of The Sleeping Beauty composed by Pyotr Ilyich Tchaikovsky. The score were altered by Lanchbery, which included "Trepak" (Russian Dance) segment from The Nutcracker.

It was choreographed by Nicholas Sergeyev, after Marius Petipa.

== Reception ==
The film was originally released on 5 July 1963 in South Africa, then in the United Kingdom on September, and in the United States on 1 December 1965.
