= Dimitry Markevitch =

Swiss-born American cellist (1923–2002)

Background information
- Born: Dimitry Markevitch; 1923
- Died: 2002 (aged 78–79)
- Genres: Classical music
- Occupations: Cellist, musicologist
- Instruments: Cello, piano

Dimitry Markevitch (1923–2002) was a Swiss-born American cellist, researcher, teacher, and musicologist. He studied under Gregor Piatigorsky and founded the Institut de Hautes Etudes Musicales (IHEM) in Switzerland. His brother, Igor Markevitch, was an orchestral conductor.

Markevitch rediscovered several important manuscripts, including Westphal and Kellner transcriptions of several Bach Suites, and published his own edition of the Suites, playing all six in recital at Carnegie Hall in New York in 1964. He also unearthed two previously unknown pieces by Ludwig van Beethoven: the Sonata for Violoncello and Piano, Opus 64, and the Kreutzer Sonata, transcribed for cello by Czerny. He contributed to editions of pieces by Mussorgsky, De Falla, Stravinsky, and Shostakovitch and wrote Cello Story, a book on the history and repertoire of the cello.

He was one of the first people to champion period performance techniques and played a baroque cello for pieces composed before the 19th century. He specialised in works for the solo cello and his book The Solo Cello is a comprehensive guide to the subject.

He was the first cellist to record the complete Kodály Opus 8 Solo Cello Sonata in addition to two sonatas for cello and piano by Louis Abbiate with Bernard Ringeissen. He recorded the Bach Cello Suites in 1992 and made the first complete recording of the Seven Sonatas for Cello and Piano by Beethoven. Through his career, he compiled an extensive and now cataloged library of over 3,000 cello scores. Dimitry Markevitch died on January 29, 2002, at home in Clarens, Switzerland.
