= Nijinsky Stakes =

Nijinsky Stakes may refer to the following horse races, named after race horse Nijinsky:

- Nijinsky Stakes (Canada)
- King George V Cup, (known as Nijinsky Stakes from 2008 to 2012, and 2020 to 2021)
- Derrinstown Stud Derby Trial (known as Nijinsky Stakes between 1971 and 1983)
