= Jean-Louis Vaudoyer =

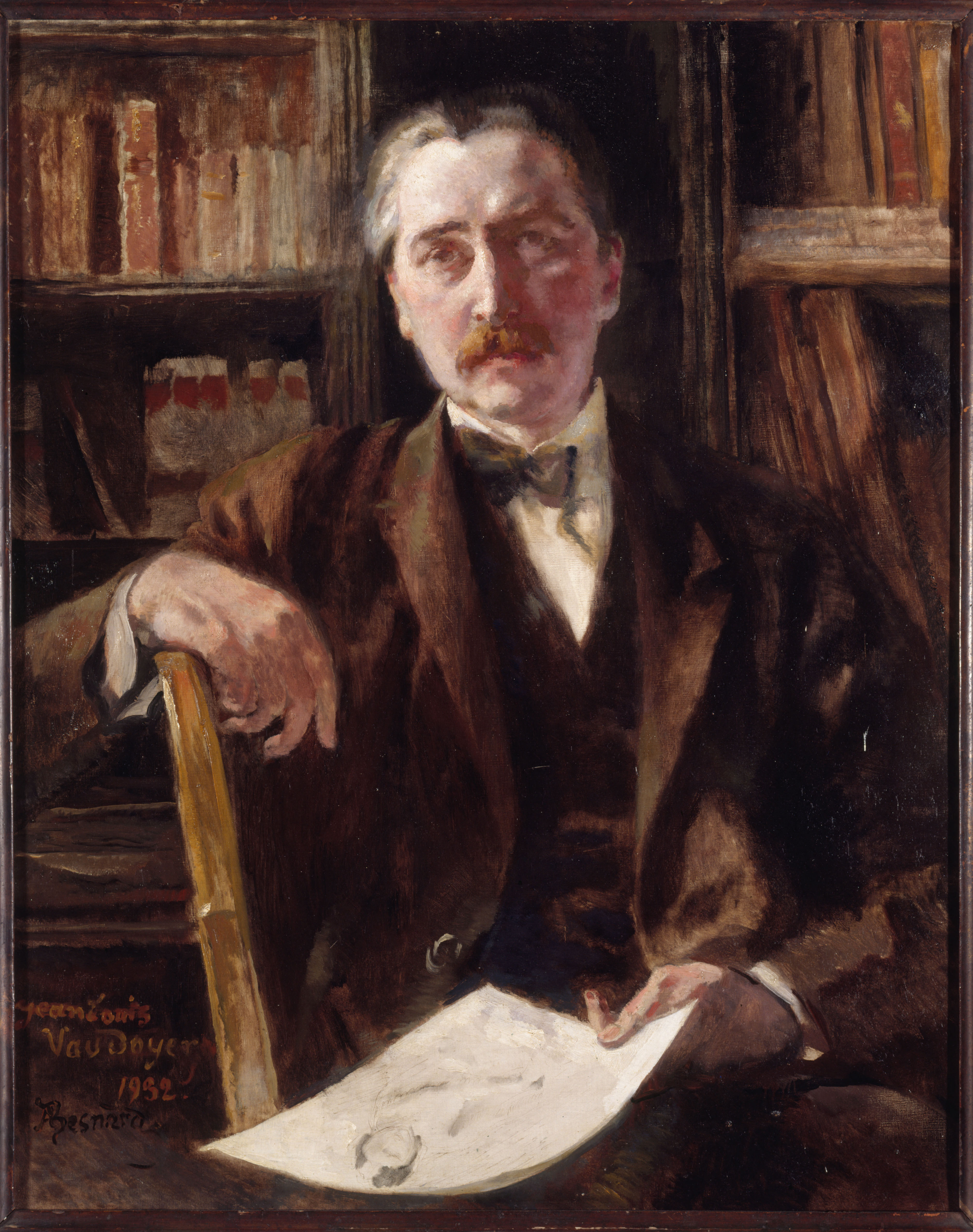
Jean-Louis Vaudoyer

Jean-Louis Vaudoyer (10 September 1883, in Le Plessis-Robinson, Hauts-de-Seine – 20 May 1963) was a French novelist, poet, essayist and art historian. He was also administrator general of the Comédie-Française from 1941 to 1944.
