= Margot Fonteyn =

English ballerina (1919–1991)

Dame Margot Fonteyn DBE
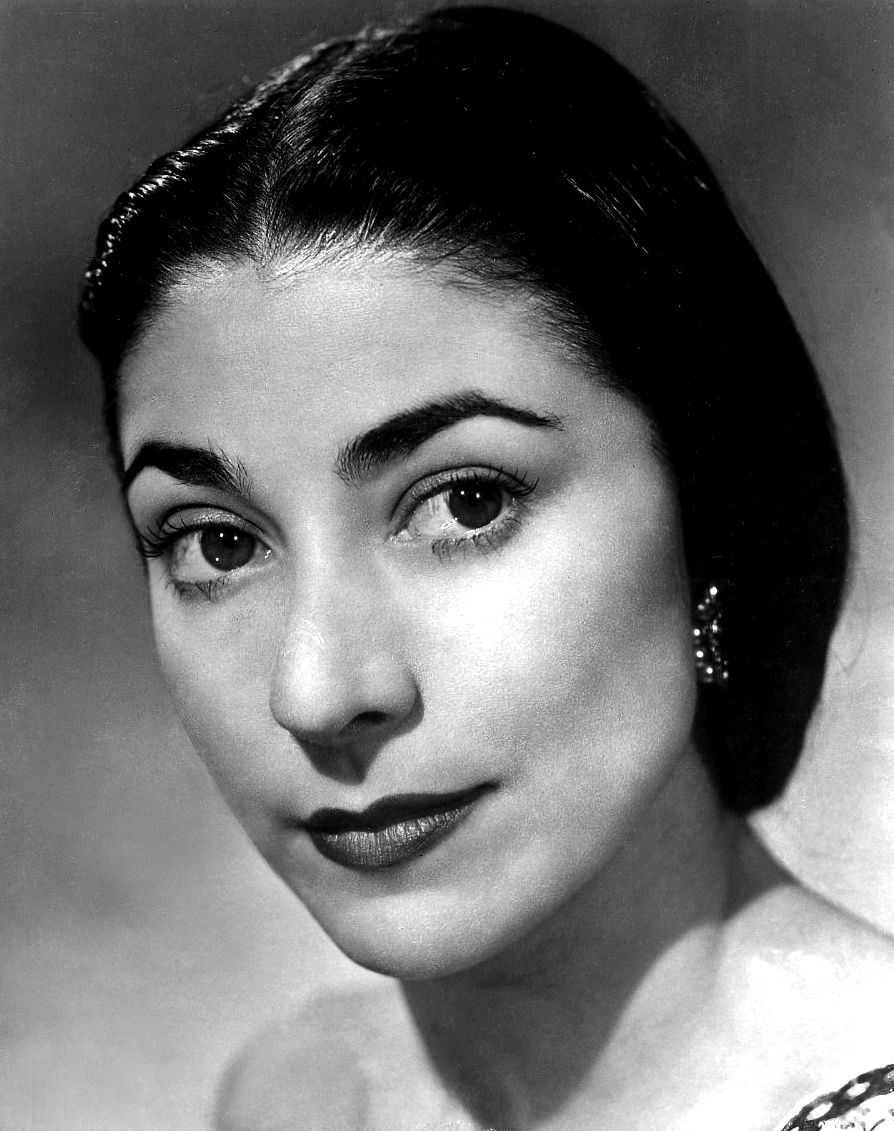
- Fonteyn in the 1960s
- Born: Margaret Evelyn Hookham; 18 May 1919; Reigate, Surrey, England
- Died: 21 February 1991 (aged 71); Panama City, Panama
- Resting place: Cremated remains rest along with her husband's at El Santuario Nacional del Corazón de Maria church, in the banking area of Panama City.
- Occupation: Ballerina
- Employer: Royal Ballet
- Known for: Ballet
- Title: Prima ballerina assoluta
- Spouse: Roberto Arias (m. 1955; d. 1989)

Dame Margaret Evelyn de Arias DBE (née Hookham; 18 May 1919 – 21 February 1991), known by the stage name Margot Fonteyn (/fɒnˈteɪn/), was an English ballerina. She spent her entire career as a dancer with the Sadler's Wells Ballet Company, now known as the Royal Ballet, eventually being appointed prima ballerina assoluta of the company by Queen Elizabeth II.

Beginning ballet lessons at the age of four, she studied in England and China, where her father was transferred for his work. Her training in Shanghai was with Russian expatriate dancer Georgy Goncharov, contributing to her continuing interest in Russian ballet. Returning to London at the age of 14, she was invited to join the Vic-Wells Ballet School by Ninette de Valois. She succeeded Alicia Markova as prima ballerina of the company in 1935. The Vic-Wells choreographer, Sir Frederick Ashton, wrote numerous parts for Fonteyn and her partner, Robert Helpmann, with whom she danced from the 1930s to the 1940s.

In 1946, the company, now renamed the Sadler's Wells Ballet, moved into the Royal Opera House at Covent Garden where Fonteyn's most frequent partner throughout the next decade was Michael Somes. Her performance in The Sleeping Beauty became a distinguishing role for both Fonteyn and the company, but she was also well known for the ballets created by Ashton, including Symphonic Variations, Cinderella, Daphnis and Chloe, Ondine and Sylvia.

In 1949, she led the company in a tour of the United States and became an international celebrity. Before and after the Second World War, Fonteyn performed in televised broadcasts of ballet performances in Britain and in the early 1950s appeared on The Ed Sullivan Show, consequently increasing the popularity of dance in the United States.

In 1955, she married the Panamanian politician Roberto Arias and appeared in a live colour production of The Sleeping Beauty aired on NBC. Three years later, she and Somes danced for the BBC television adaptation of Tchaikovsky'sThe Nutcracker. Thanks to her international acclaim and many guest artist requests, the Royal Ballet allowed Fonteyn to become a freelance dancer in 1959.

In 1961, when Fonteyn was considering retirement, Rudolf Nureyev defected from the Kirov Ballet while dancing in Paris. Fonteyn, though reluctant to partner with him because of their 19-year age difference, danced with him in his début with the Royal Ballet in Giselle on 21 February 1962. The duo immediately became an international sensation, each dancer pushing the other to their best performances. They were most noted for their classical performances in works such as Le Corsaire Pas de Deux, Les Sylphides, La Bayadère, Swan Lake, and Raymonda, in which Nureyev sometimes adapted choreographies specifically to showcase their talents. The pair premièred Ashton's Marguerite and Armand, which had been choreographed specifically for them, and were noted for their performance in the title roles of Sir Kenneth MacMillan's Romeo and Juliet.

In 1964 Fonteyn's husband was shot during an assassination attempt and became a quadriplegic, requiring constant care for the remainder of his life. In 1972, Fonteyn went into semi-retirement, although she continued to dance periodically until the end of the decade. In 1979, she was fêted by the Royal Ballet and officially pronounced the prima ballerina assoluta of the company. She retired to Panama, where she spent her time writing books, raising cattle, and caring for her husband. She died from ovarian cancer exactly 29 years after her premiere with Nureyev in Giselle.

== Early life (1919–1934) ==
Margaret Evelyn Hookham was born on 18 May 1919 in Reigate to Hilda (née Acheson Fontes) and Felix John Hookham. Her father was a British mechanical engineer, who worked for the British-American Tobacco Company. Her mother was the illegitimate daughter of an Irish woman, Evelyn Acheson, and the Brazilian industrialist Antonio Gonçalves Fontes. Hookham had one sibling, her older brother Felix. The family moved to Ealing, where her mother sent her four-year-old daughter with her brother to ballet classes with Grace Bosustow. Her mother accompanied Hookham to her earliest lessons, learning the basic positions alongside her daughter in order to improve her understanding of what a ballet student needed to develop. Over the years, Hilda provided constant support, guidance and critique to her daughter; she became a well-known backstage presence at Hookham's performances, earning the nickname "Black Queen" from Hookham's teachers and colleagues. While some children might have balked at such overbearing attention from a parent, Hookham accepted her mother's help with "affectionate and unembarrassed naturalness".

In July 1924, at the age of five, Hookham danced in a charity concert and received her first newspaper review: the Middlesex Country Times noted that the young dancer had performed "a remarkably fine solo" which had been "vigorously encored" by the audience. Even during her early years, Hookham showed signs of the pressure she felt to succeed in her dancing, often pushing herself physically to avoid becoming a disappointment to others. Whenever a dance exam approached, she became ill with a high fever for several days, recovering just in time to take the test. Hookham's father began preparing to move his family abroad for work. It was decided, after consultation, that they would take their daughter with them but leave their son Felix at an English boarding school. For Hookham, this new separation from her sibling was a painful experience. Her father was transferred first to Louisville, Kentucky, where Hookham attended school but did not take ballet lessons, as her mother was skeptical about the quality of the local dance school. When Peggy – as she was called in her childhood – was nine, she and her parents moved to China.

For about a year, the family lived in Tianjin. This was followed by a brief stint in Hong Kong before they moved to Shanghai in 1931, where Hookham studied ballet with the Russian émigré teacher Georgy Goncharov. Goncharov's partner Vera Volkova later became influential in Hookham's career and training. Hookham had no dreams of becoming a dancer and was a reluctant student, but she was competitive. Having June Brae in her classes pushed her to work harder. She did not like the Cecchetti drills, preferring the fluid expression of the Russian style. Her mother brought her back to London when she was 14, to pursue a ballet career. In 1934, Hookham's father wrote from Shanghai, explaining he had been having an affair. He asked his wife for a divorce so that he could marry his new girlfriend. Continuing to work in Shanghai, her father was interned during World War II from 1943 to 1945 by the invading Japanese. After the war, he returned to England with his second wife, Beatrice.

Hookham began her studies with Serafina Astafieva, but was spotted by Dame Ninette de Valois and invited to join the Vic-Wells Ballet School, which would later become the Royal Ballet. She trained under Olga Preobrajenska and Volkova. Her first solo performance occurred in 1933, as an actress rather than a dancer, using the interim name Margot Fontes, as a child in the production of The Haunted Ballroom by de Valois. In 1934, she danced as a snowflake in The Nutcracker, still using the name Fontes. Although Hookham's mother had written to her Fontes relatives, requesting their permission for her daughter to use the name for her stage career, the final response was no, possibly due to the family's wish to avoid an association with a theatrical performer. Hilda and her daughter subsequently looked up variations of Fontes in the telephone directory, choosing the more British-sounding Fontene and adding a twist to make it Fonteyn. The following year, she took the name by which she was known for the remainder of her professional life, "Margot Fonteyn", modifying her maternal grandfather's surname, "Fontes" — in Portuguese, "fonte" means "fountain". In Middle and modern English until the 16th century, it was spelled "fonteyn". Her brother, Felix, who became a specialist of dance photography, eventually adopted the same surname.

== Career ==
=== Vic-Wells years (1935–1945) ===
In 1935, Fonteyn had her solo debut, playing Young Tregennis in The Haunted Ballroom. That same year, Sir Frederick Ashton created the role of the bride in his choreography of Stravinsky's Le baiser de la fée specifically for her. Though he appreciated her lyric qualities and found her elegant, Ashton said of her early years that Fonteyn had brittle stubbornness and lacked polish. In spite of her perceived shortcomings, he cast her as the lead, playing the Creole girl in his production, Rio Grande. When Alicia Markova, the first Prima Ballerina of the company, left the Vic-Wells later in 1935, Fonteyn shared the lead with other members of the company, but quickly rose to the top of the field of dancers. That year, she spent her summer holidays in Paris, where she studied with the exiled Russian ballerinas Olga Preobrajenska, Mathilde Kschessinska, and Lubov Egorova. She returned for further studies with them the following summers.

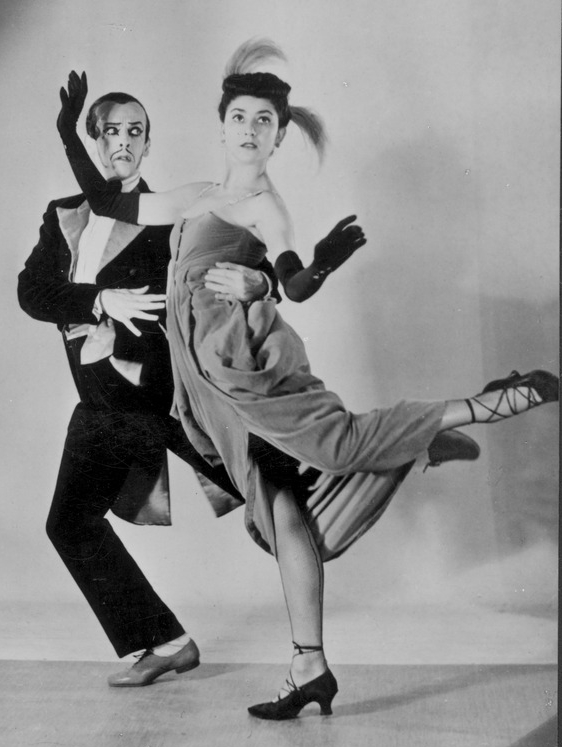
Robert Helpmann and Margot Fonteyn, Façade (1936)

Using Fonteyn's delicate and somewhat feline grace to advantage, "Sir Frederick often cast her as a frail or otherworldly being". In 1936, she was cast as the unattainable muse in his Apparitions, a role that consolidated her partnership with Robert Helpmann, and the same year played a wistful, poverty-stricken flower seller in Nocturne. Her success in Nocturne marked a turning point in Ashton's perception of Fonteyn and he recognized that she could become the heir to Markova as lead dancer for the company. Shortly afterwards, the company began experimenting with televised performances, accepting paid engagements to perform for the BBC at Broadcasting House and Alexandra Palace. Fonteyn danced her first televised solo in December 1936, performing the Polka from Façade. Although the dancers enjoyed these engagements, the tiny television screens with their unsteady blue pictures meant that the medium was not yet sophisticated enough to become a lucrative avenue for the company.

The following year, Fonteyn was given the comic role of Julia in A Wedding Bouquet and was cast with Robert Helpmann performing the pas de deux, imitating Victorian ice skaters, in Ashton's Les Patineurs. Helpmann was her most constant partner in the 1930s and 1940s, helping her develop her theatricality. Decades later Fonteyn would name Helpmann as her favourite partner across the span of her career. Constant Lambert, as the company music director, assisted with her musicality. Beginning in 1935, Fonteyn and Lambert developed a romantic relationship, which would continue on and off for the duration of his life. She had previously been involved with Donald Hodson, the Controller of the BBC Overseas Service. Lambert dedicated his score for the ballet Horoscope (1938) to Fonteyn.

When the company visited the University of Cambridge for a brief professional engagement in 1937, Fonteyn first met Roberto "Tito" Arias, an 18-year-old law student from Panama who would later become her husband. Fonteyn became enamored with Arias after seeing him perform a rumba dance at a party. The pair enjoyed their time together for the next week, but Arias then returned to Panama for the summer holidays. His lack of subsequent communication left Fonteyn despondent.

By 1939 Fonteyn had performed the principal roles in Giselle and Tchaikovsky's Swan Lake and The Sleeping Beauty and was appointed as the Prima Ballerina of the Vic-Wells, soon to be renamed the Sadler's Wells Ballet. Her performance in Swan Lake had been a turning point in her career, convincing critics and audiences that a British ballerina could successfully dance the lead role in a full-length classical Russian ballet. The reviewer Arnold Haskell wrote that never before had Fonteyn's performance been "so regal in manner or half so brilliant", while the writer Tangye Lean commented that she "rose to it with a stability that one had not seen in her before".

Throughout World War II, the company danced nightly, sometimes also performing matinées, to entertain troops. With such a heavy schedule, the dancers were frequently obliged to complete three to four times their usual weekly number of appearances. Fonteyn later recalled dancing so often that she sometimes "stood trembling in the wings, unable to remember if I had finished my solo before I left the stage". Wartime drafts meant that the company lost many of its male dancers to the armed forces. Shows had to be carefully chosen or edited to help ensure that an almost entirely female cast could perform all the roles. Fonteyn was often paired with young, inexperienced male dancers pulled straight from ballet schools. With short London seasons, they also travelled abroad and were in the Netherlands when it was invaded in May 1940, escaping back to England with nothing more than the costumes they were wearing. In September 1940, as the London Blitz began, the Sadler's Wells Theatre was turned into an air raid shelter. The company of dancers was temporarily displaced, touring professionally across England.

In August 1943, Fonteyn took an unexplained sick leave from the company for two months, missing their opening season performances. It was believed by many of her close friends – and her biographer, Meredith Daneman, that she underwent an abortion. Her relationship with Lambert had grown difficult, as he was drinking heavily and having affairs with other women. Concerned about her daughter's welfare, Fonteyn's mother took matters into her own hands, gently encouraging her daughter to move on from Lambert by setting her up with film director Charles Hasse. Fonteyn and Hasse became lovers, and their close relationship lasted for the next four years.

During the war, Ashton created roles such as his bleak wartime piece Dante Sonata (1940) and the glittery The Wanderer (1941) for Fonteyn. She also performed notably in Coppélia, imbuing the role with humour. The war years helped her develop stamina and improve her natural talent. In February 1944, she danced the role of the Young Girl in Le Spectre de la Rose and was coached by Russian prima ballerina Tamara Karsavina.

=== Covent Garden years (1946–1955) ===
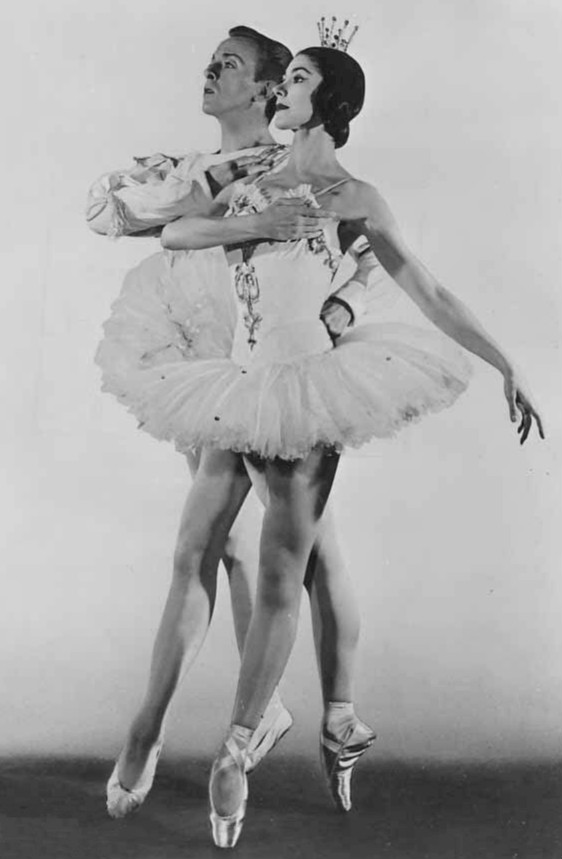
Fonteyn and Helpmann, The Sleeping Beauty, Sadler's Wells 1950 U.S. tour

In 1946, the company moved to the Royal Opera House at Covent Garden. One of Fonteyn's first roles was at a command performance of The Sleeping Beauty as Aurora with King George, Queen Elizabeth, Queen Mary, both princesses – Elizabeth and Margaret – and Prime Minister Clement Attlee in attendance. Initially faced with a costume department severely impacted by post-war rationing, the company had put out a call for every available scrap of silk, velvet or brocade, cutting up and re-purposing old opera costumes, furs and even velvet curtains to create a lavish production. In contrast to most Russian dancers, who traditionally learned roles from previous generations of dancers, Fonteyn had no such living references readily available to teach her the role of Aurora and was obliged to create her own interpretation. The ballet became a signature production for the company and a distinguishing role for Fonteyn, marking her "arrival" as the "brightest crown" of the Sadler's Wells Company.

Ashton immediately created Symphonic Variations to capitalize on the success of the opening. Of the six dancers in the production, Fonteyn's performance was dubbed "brilliant" and Moira Shearer was singled out for her elegance. When the American Ballet Theatre visited the Royal Opera House in 1946, Fonteyn became a close friend of the New York dancer Nora Kaye. Fonteyn appeared on television in 1946, to mark the re-opening of Alexandra Palace after the War. Her television appearances were followed by a performance with the choreographer Léonide Massine as the miller's wife in his The Three-Cornered Hat and as the lead in the abstract debut of Scènes de ballet which Ashton wrote for her.

In 1948, Fonteyn went to Paris to perform as Agathe, a role created for her, in Les Demoiselles de la nuit by the choreographer Roland Petit. The admiration of Petit gave her new confidence and assurance, which showed in her performance in Ashton's Don Juan, though she was injured on the first night, tearing a ligament in her ankle. She was unable to dance for several months, missing the premiere of Ashton's Cinderella. She recovered sufficiently to dance with Michael Somes in the Christmas presentation of the ballet, and made her mark in the role of Cinderella by challenging the traditional costume for Act I, replacing the usual brown outfit with a stark black dress and a kerchief tied severely over her hair. Observers commented that Fonteyn inserted a new, stronger sense of pathos into the performance.

Reprising the role of Aurora in 1949 when the Royal Ballet toured the United States, Fonteyn instantly became a celebrity, gaining international recognition. In New York, the American showman Sol Hurok said that the Metropolitan Opera House premiere of Fonteyn's Aurora was the "most outstanding" performance he had ever facilitated, the curtain calls lasting half an hour. The New York Herald Tribune called Fonteyn "unmistakably such a star": "London has known this for some time, Europe has found it out and last night she definitely conquered another continent." Fonteyn was featured on the cover of Time and Newsweek.

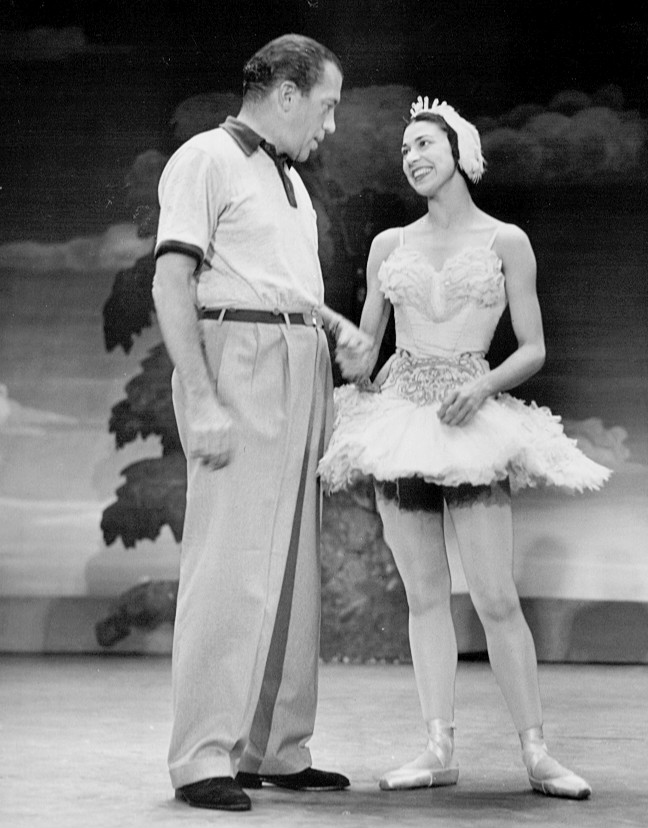
At a rehearsal for The Ed Sullivan Show in 1953 (at the time known as Toast of the Town)

Upon returning to England, Fonteyn danced in George Balanchine's Ballet Imperial, before travelling to Italy with Helpmann and Pamela May as a guest star in The Sleeping Beauty. In 1949, she profiled choreographies of Sir Frederick Ashton, which were no longer in the repertoire of the Sadler's Wells Company, dancing on television with Michael Somes and Harold Turner. Fonteyn appeared in America on The Ed Sullivan Show for the first time in 1951, and would return several times. Her performances were credited with improving the popularity of dance with American audiences. These were followed by two of her most noted roles, as the lead in Ashton's Daphnis and Chloe (1951) and Sylvia (1952).

Fonteyn was honoured as a Commander of the Order of the British Empire in 1951 for her contributions to British ballet. Plagued by injury, she considered retiring, especially after her most frequent partner of the 1950s, Somes, began to take less challenging roles. On an American tour in 1953, Fonteyn found herself suddenly reacquainted with Roberto "Tito" Arias – whom she had spent time with at Cambridge University in 1937 – when he surprised her with a visit to her dressing room after a performance of Sleeping Beauty. Arias was now a politician and Panamanian delegate to the United Nations. Although he already had a wife and children, Arias initiated a courtship with Fonteyn and began seeking a divorce from his wife. She returned from the American tour and in the 1954 season debuted in Entrada de Madame Butterfly, later called Entrée japonaise, in Granada, Spain, followed by her first performance in the title role of The Firebird. She was taught the part by Tamara Karsavina, who had debuted the role in 1910. Fonteyn's "Firebird" was "among her greatest achievements" for her ability to use her jetés to simulate flight.

=== Marriage and politics (1955–1959) ===
In Paris on 6 February 1955, Fonteyn married Arias, adopting the formal married name of "Margot Fonteyn de Arias", in the Spanish-language tradition. In 1955, she returned to the stage and found success in St. Petersburg, dancing the role of Medora in Le Corsaire, opposite Rudolf Nureyev. On 12 December 1955, Fonteyn appeared with Michael Somes in a live U.S. television colour production of Tchaikovsky's The Sleeping Beauty, for the anthology series Producers' Showcase, on NBC. The production was underwritten by the Ford Company and ran for an hour and a half, attracting around 30 million viewers.

In 1956, she and Somes were guest artists featured in Act II of Swan Lake, at the wedding of Grace Kelly and Prince Rainier III of Monaco. The following year, the duo appeared in a Producers' Showcase production of Cinderella. Fonteyn starred with Somes in a 1958 BBC Television adaptation of The Nutcracker, which premiered on 21 December. She was successful in two other Ashton ballets, La Péri (1956) and Ondine (1958), before becoming a freelance dancer in 1959, allowing her to accept the many international engagements she was offered.

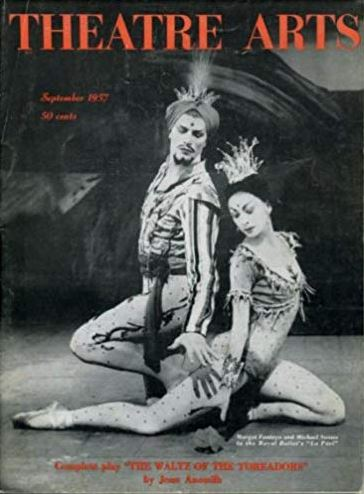
Michael Somes and Margot Fonteyn, Theatre Arts Magazine September 1957

Shortly before her marriage, Fonteyn had been selected to succeed Adeline Genée, as president of the Royal Academy of Dance and though she protested the appointment, the academy overruled her decision. Adding planning meetings for a new dance syllabus and attending meetings of the academy, she was honoured as a Dame Commander of the Order of the British Empire in 1956 New Years Honours List. As her husband had been appointed an ambassador to the court of St James upon her marriage, Fonteyn also attended to the duties required of a diplomat's wife. She was nevertheless criticized for her obvious lack of interest in politics.

In 1956, she gave four performances in Johannesburg, South Africa, at His Majesty's Theatre and another at Zoo Lake with Michael Somes. Though they received excellent reviews, she was criticized for performing, despite the dancers' union ban because of apartheid. She was also criticized for performing for Imelda Marcos and was once detained for attending a party at which drugs were used. She also danced in Chile during Military dictatorship, and she became close to Hope Somoza, the wife of future Nicaraguan dictator Anastasio Somoza Debayle.

==== Coup plot in Panama ====
In April 1959, Fonteyn was arrested, detained for 24 hours in a Panamanian jail, and then deported to New York City, after her husband had staged a coup d'état against Panamanian President Ernesto de la Guardia, possibly with the support of Fidel Castro. According to Fonteyn, the plot was hatched when she and her husband were visiting Cuba in January 1959, with Castro promising to assist Arias with arms or men. The couple went fishing on their boat The Nola and during the voyage ordered fishermen to raise a buoy loaded with arms. The fishermen reported the couple, who hurriedly decided that Arias should try to escape detection. In the night Arias jumped ship, boarding the shrimp boat Elaine, while Fonteyn used her own yacht as a decoy to divert the government forces. She returned to Panama City to turn herself in, hoping her surrender would help her husband.

Meeting at the prison with the British ambassador to Panama Sir Ian Henderson, Fonteyn confessed her involvement and the British Foreign Office granted that her statement would remain confidential. The British embassy arranged for her release, and flew her to New York City on 22 April, without disclosing to the United States government that Cuba had been involved in the plot. Arias took refuge in the Brazilian embassy of Panama and arrived safely in Lima, Peru, the same day Fonteyn arrived in New York. The couple were reunited in June in Rio de Janeiro and by November she had returned to the stage, dancing with Michael Somes in an Ashton pas de deux for a London benefit performance. Fonteyn danced in the BBC Eurovision production of The Sleeping Beauty in the title role with Jelko Yuresha on 20 December 1959.

=== Nureyev years (1961–1979) ===
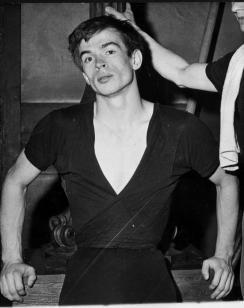
Rudolf Nureyev, 1961, at his defection

Fonteyn began her greatest artistic partnership at a time when many people, including the head of the Royal Ballet, Ninette de Valois, thought she was about to retire. In 1961 Rudolf Nureyev, star of the Kirov Ballet, defected in Paris and was invited by de Valois to join the Royal Ballet. De Valois offered Fonteyn the opportunity to dance with Nureyev in his debut, and though reluctant because of their 19-year age difference, Fonteyn agreed.

On 21 February 1962, Nureyev and Fonteyn performed together in Giselle to an enthusiastic capacity crowd, for which they received 15 minutes of applause and 20 curtain calls. The performance was followed by a show-stopping performance of Le Corsaire Pas de Deux on 3 November.

The press described their performance as "otherworldly"; The Observer called it a "knockout" and the pairing "history-making". A few days later, they performed Les Sylphides to rave reviews, which were carried in United States newspapers. Fonteyn was awarded an honorary Doctor of Laws from the University of Cambridge in 1962.

Sir Frederick Ashton choreographed Marguerite and Armand for them, which no other couple danced until the 21st century. The 1963 premiere was well publicised before its opening and teamed them with Michael Somes, who played the disapproving father. Composed as a series of pas de deux, interrupted by only one solo, the ballet built intensity from the initial coup de foudre to the death scene. According to Somes, the pairing of Nureyev and Fonteyn was brilliant, as they were not partners but two stars of equal talent who pushed each other to their best performances. Attended by the Queen Mother, Princess Margaret and Princess Marina, the production was an immediate success. It became a signature work for the duo, sealing their partnership.

In 1964, Fonteyn and Nureyev toured from Sydney to Melbourne, performing in Giselle and Swan Lake with The Australian Ballet. After a brief break, they resumed their performances in Stuttgart. On 8 June that year, while the duo were performing in Bath, they were advised that a rival Panamanian politician had shot Fonteyn's husband Arias, but it was unclear if he was in imminent danger. Fonteyn, though shaken, danced in MacMillan's new pas de deux, Divertimento, on 9 June, before flying home to Panama.

She found that Arias had been shot four times by Alfredo Jimenez, leaving him a quadriplegic for the rest of his life. Thoughts of retirement receded, as she needed to continue working to pay Arias' medical bills. Though he used a wheelchair, Fonteyn took him with her on most of her travels. Within two weeks, she had returned to London, having arranged for Arias to be treated at the National Spinal Injuries Centre of the Stoke Mandeville Hospital, and resumed dancing. Over the next ten days, Fonteyn danced in six performances of La Bayadère, Giselle, and Marguerite and Armand while rehearsing Nureyev's production of Raymonda. A coma and relapse in Arias' condition forced her to miss all but the final performance of Raymonda in Spoleto.

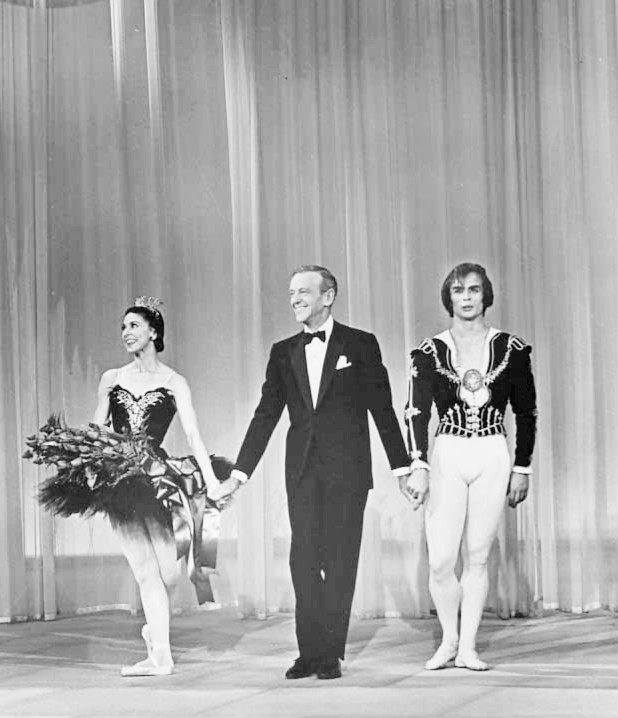
Fonteyn, Fred Astaire and Nureyev on The Hollywood Palace television show, 1965

Fonteyn and Nureyev were especially noted for their performance of classics, such as The Sleeping Beauty and Swan Lake, which Fonteyn stripped to the essence of the roles and constantly improved her performance. Nureyev insisted that Fonteyn partner with him in La Bayadère and Raymonda, and wrote his own version of Swan Lake for them to perform with the Vienna State Opera Ballet in 1964. The performance was filmed and Lord Snowdon took pictures for the 27 November 1964 issue of Life. On 20 January 1965, Fonteyn and Nureyev performed the Le Corsaire Pas de Deux at the inaugural ceremonies for President Lyndon B. Johnson in Washington, D. C.

Later that year, the couple debuted the title roles in Romeo and Juliet choreographed by Sir Kenneth MacMillan. MacMillan had intended the roles to be performed by Lynn Seymour and Christopher Gable, but David Webster, the manager of the Royal Opera House, insisted on Fonteyn and Nureyev. A year after the debut, the production was still drawing queues for its nightly performances. The audiences littered the duo with flowers, demanding repeated curtain-calls. Fonteyn's depth as an actor made the performance unique, making Juliet one of her most acclaimed roles.

Despite differences in background and temperament – she was methodical while he was wildly exuberant – and a 19-year gap in their ages, Fonteyn and Nureyev became lifelong friends and famously loyal to each other. Fonteyn would not approve an unflattering photograph of Nureyev, nor would she dance with other partners in ballets within his repertoire. The extent of their physical relationship remains unclear. Nureyev said that they had one, while Fonteyn denied it. Her biographer, Meredith Daneman, said that in spite of no real evidence, her opinion was that they did, yet Nureyev's biographer, Diane Solway concluded that they did not. Nureyev said about her:

"At the end of 'Lac des Cygnes', when she left the stage in her great white tutu I would have followed her to the end of the world."

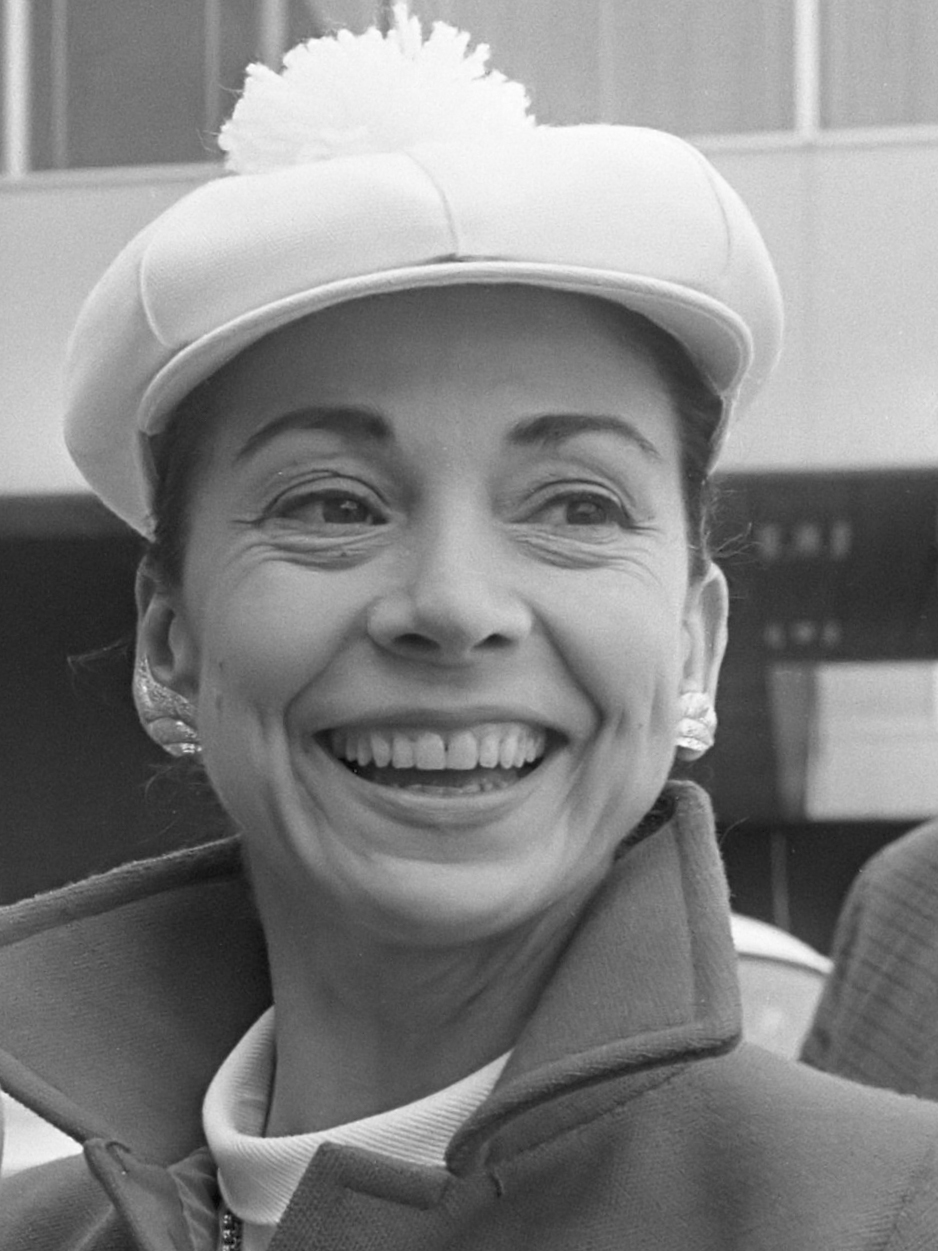
Fonteyn in 1968

In 1965, Fonteyn and Nureyev appeared together in the recorded versions Les Sylphides, and the Le Corsaire Pas de Deux, as part of the documentary An Evening with the Royal Ballet. The film grossed over US$1 million, creating a record for a dance film at the time, and was shown in over 50 theatres in New York and New Jersey alone over the week of 6 December 1965. Under the guidance of director Paul Czinner, who used a multi-camera technique to give the feel of a stage performance, they also filmed their famous version of Romeo and Juliet in 1966. That same year, she was awarded an honorary doctorate of music by the Duke of Devonshire upon his installation as the Chancellor of the University of Manchester.

In 1967 Roland Petit wrote a new ballet for the duo, Paradise Lost. It was an abstract, modern production designed to emphasize Rudolf as a virile Adam and Fonteyn as a chic Eve. With pop art décor and flashing neon, the ballet titillated the fans, including Mick Jagger and his girlfriend, the singer Marianne Faithfull.

Fonteyn went into semi-retirement in 1972, relinquishing parts in full ballets and limiting herself to only a variety of one-act performances. In 1974, she was awarded the Royal Society of Arts' Benjamin Franklin Medal, in recognition of her having built bridges between Britain and the U.S. through her art. She ventured into modern dance, performing as "Desdemona" in José Limón' The Moor's Pavane June 1975 with the Chicago Ballet followed by a performance of the same dance with Nureyev at The Kennedy Center in Washington, D.C., in July. Between the two performances, Fonteyn was appearing with the Martha Graham Dance Company in Saratoga, New York City, Athens and London. After the performance at The Kennedy Center, her tour went on to Brazil.

In November 1975, she and Nureyev appeared in Fonteyn & Nureyev on Broadway at the Uris Theatre. The appearance, though memorable, confirmed that Fonteyn was no longer able to execute more demanding roles. In 1976, she published her autobiography, though it was not a tell-all. Her husband was still living and Fonteyn was a very private person, as well as proper and fastidious. In 1977, she was awarded the Shakespeare Prize, in Hamburg by the Alfred Toepfer Stiftung F.V.S., as the first dancer ever honoured with the award.

=== Cattle rancher (1979–1990) ===
Fonteyn retired in 1979 at the age of 60, 45 years after becoming the Royal Ballet's prima ballerina. Fonteyn and Nureyev had created a partnership on and off stage that lasted until her retirement, after which they remained lifelong friends. For her 60th birthday, Fonteyn was feted by the Royal Ballet, dancing a duet with Ashton in his Salut d'amour and a tango from Ashton's Façade with her former partner Helpmann. At the end of the evening, she was officially pronounced prima ballerina assoluta of the Royal Ballet. She performed with Nureyev in his summer season, taking the part of lead nymph in L'après-midi d'un faune by Vaslav Nijinsky and as the girl in Le Spectre de la rose. Fonteyn and Nureyev remained close even after she retired to a Panama cattle farm with her husband. The small farmhouse near El Higo, which did not have a telephone, was in a remote village, but she stayed in touch and the two occasionally performed together. Making telephone calls from a neighbour's hotel, Fonteyn spoke with Nureyev several times each week. She discovered that she had a real interest in raising cattle and developed a herd of four hundred head.

In 1979, Fonteyn wrote The Magic of Dance which was aired on the BBC as a television series in which she starred and was published in book form. The six-part BBC2 series, explored aspects in the development of dance from the 17th to the 20th century across the world, including scenes shot on location in Australia, China, France, Monte Carlo, Russia, and the United States. It included coverage of a wide range of dancers besides herself and Nureyev, including Fred Astaire, Mikhail Baryshnikov, Sammy Davis Jr., Isadora Duncan, Fanny Elssler, Kyra Nijinsky and Marie Taglioni. The series caused a stir because up to that time she had not been known for speaking on camera, and after rehearsing what she would say on each segment, she ad libbed the lines without cue cards. Though some critics failed to grasp that the production was neither a history of dance nor Fonteyn's biography, the series was "brilliantly successful" and Fonteyn received praise from American, Australian, and British critics.

That same year, Fonteyn also published A Dancer's World: An Introduction for Parents and Students. She danced the role of "Lady Capulet" in Nureyev's Romeo and Juliet with Rudolf and Carla Fracci performing the leading roles in 1981 at the Met in New York City. In 1982, she was made chancellor of Durham University, which she accepted as a great honour, considering her limited and frequently interrupted education. She travelled to Durham annually to attend the degree ceremony of the graduates and wholeheartedly participated in the duties required until her death. In 1983, she was awarded an honorary doctorate of fine arts from Santa Clara University, in the California city of the same name. Fonteyn also published Pavlova: Portrait of a Dancer, in 1984, as a homage to Anna Pavlova, whom she admired. In February 1986 (aged 66) she appeared on stage in Miami, in a two-night engagement, as the Queen in The Sleeping Beauty. Fonteyn's last performance with Nureyev occurred at the Maratona-Festa a Corte, in Mantua, Italy, on 16 September 1988 in Baroque Pas de Trois, along with ballerina Carla Fracci.

In 1989, shortly before the death of her husband, Fonteyn was diagnosed with ovarian cancer. Having used up all her savings to care for Arias in his long infirmity, and now retired without a pension, she dreaded the ordeal. Her step-daughter, Querube Arias, cared for her and accompanied her to Houston, Texas, on her regular trips to M.D. Anderson Hospital. Nureyev was one of the few people she told of her problems and he arranged to visit her regularly in Houston, despite his busy schedule as a performer and choreographer. By 1990, she had undergone three operations and was bedridden. Out of money, Fonteyn began to sell her jewelry to pay for her care, and Nureyev anonymously helped to pay the bills. In February 1990 the Public Broadcasting Service aired The Margot Fonteyn Story as part of its series Great Performances. In the documentary, Nureyev said that they danced with "one body, one soul". Fonteyn's biographer, Daneman, said their uncanny bond of empathy went beyond the understanding most people have for each other: "Most people are on level A. They were on level Z". In May, a gala was held at Covent Gardens to raise money for her care. Placido Domingo volunteered to sing and both Somes and Nureyev danced. The event was attended by more than 2,000 guests, including Princess Margaret, Diana, Princess of Wales, and Dame Ninette de Valois, raising £250,000 for a trust fund to provide for Fonteyn's support.

== Death and legacy ==
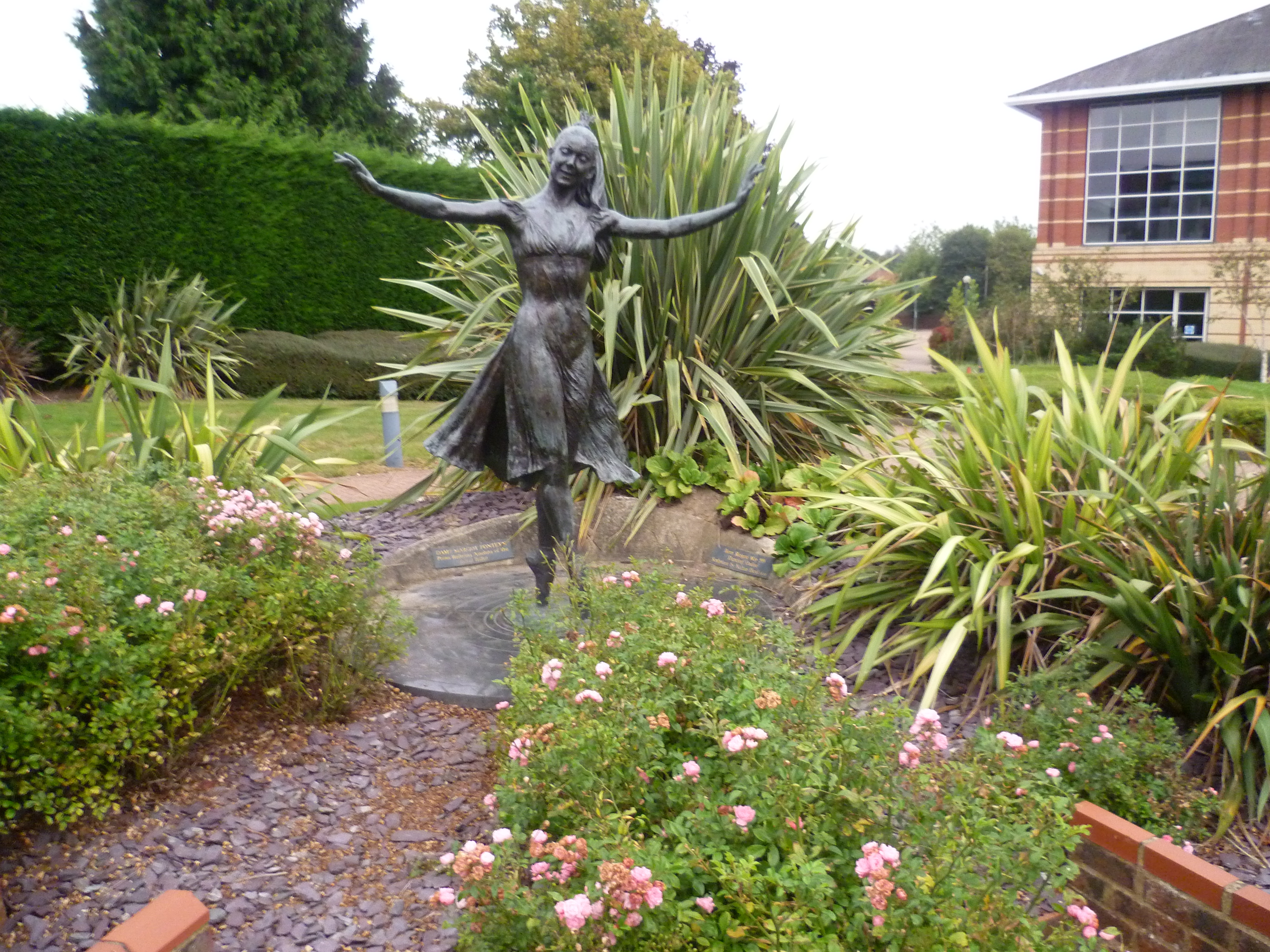
Nathan David's bronze statue of Fonteyn in Reigate, Surrey

Shortly before her death, Fonteyn converted to Roman Catholicism so that she could have her ashes buried in the same tomb as Arias. As her health worsened, she received a regular flood of messages and flowers from well-wishers, including Queen Elizabeth II and the President of Panama. Fonteyn died on 21 February 1991 in a hospital in Panama City, aged 71, on the 29th anniversary of her premiere with Nureyev in Giselle. She was buried with Arias near their home in Panama and a memorial service was held in London on 2 July 1991 at Westminster Abbey. A grief-stricken Nureyev, who was dealing with his own health issues in the form of AIDS, was unable to attend either service.

In her hometown of Reigate, a statue created by British sculptor Nathan David in 1980, stands in tribute to Fonteyn. Depicting her in her favourite role of "Ondine", the statue was commissioned by fans worldwide. The main hall in Dunelm House, the Student Union building at the University of Durham, is named the Fonteyn Ballroom in her honour, as is the foyer to the Great Hall of University College, Durham, in Durham Castle. In 2005, Margot's Closet, a dancing apparel and accessory shop, named in homage to Fonteyn, opened in Marietta, Georgia, an Atlanta suburb. The Margot Fonteyn Academy of Ballet established in Peekskill, New York, in 2007 is named in her honour.

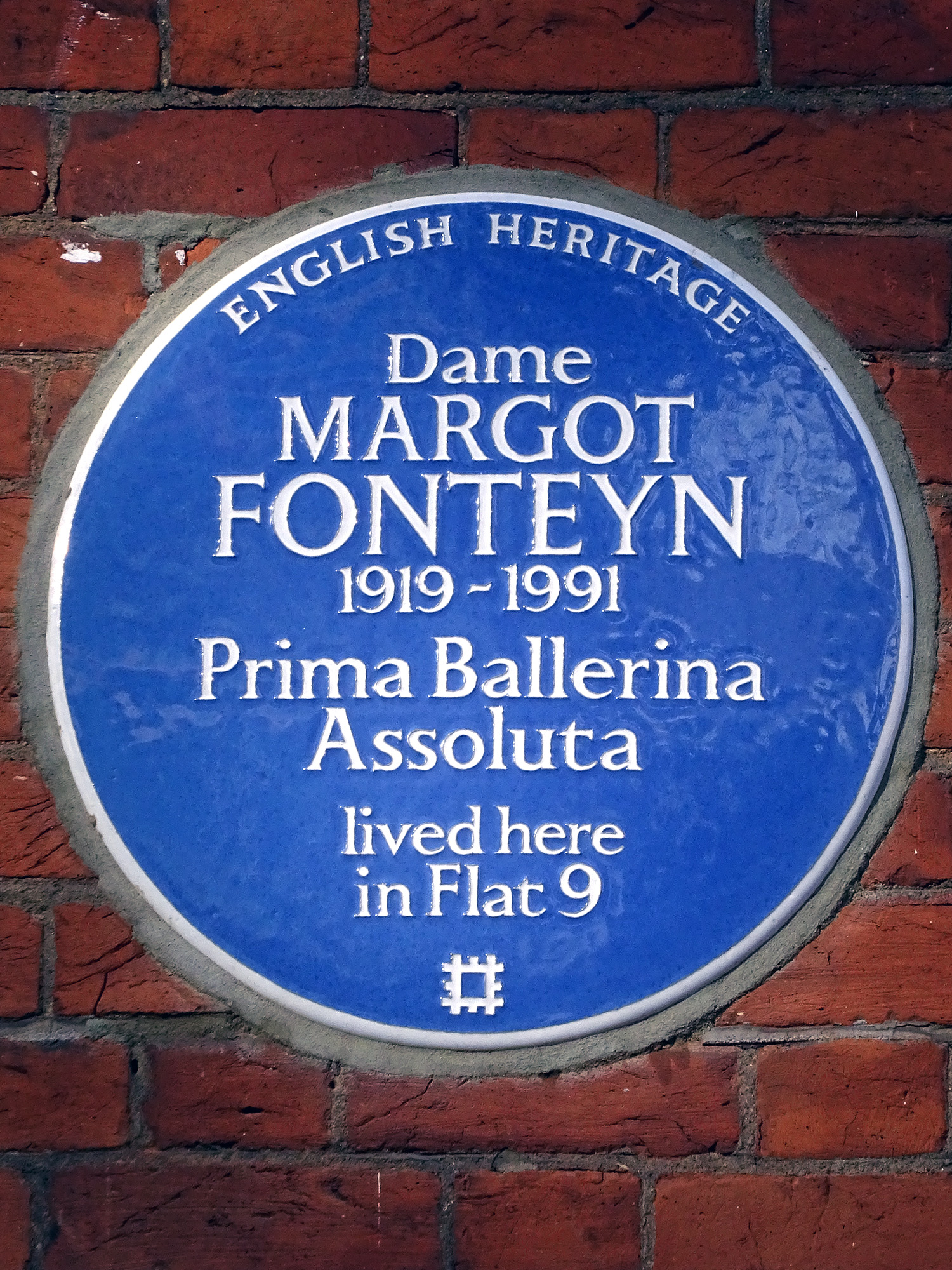
2016 Blue Plaque at Fonteyn's residence

In the early 1990s, the fossil plant Williamsonia margotiana was named after Fonteyn. She was one of five "Women of Achievement" selected for a set of British stamps issued in August 1996. In the 1998 film Hilary and Jackie about British cellist Jacqueline du Pre, Fonteyn is portrayed in a cameo appearance by Nyree Dawn Porter. In 2005 Tony Palmer made a documentary for ITV about Fonteyn, titled simply Margot. It includes interviews with several colleagues from the dance world, Nureyev's personal assistant, and Fonteyn's sister-in-law, Phoebe Fonteyn. The BBC made a film about Fonteyn, broadcast on 30 November 2009, based on Daneman's biography and starring Anne-Marie Duff as the ballerina. In 2016, the English Heritage Trust installed a blue plaque on the building where Fonteyn lived when she was performing with the Sadler's Wells Ballet. To mark the 100th anniversary of her birth, The Theatre and Film Guild installed a commemorative blue plaque to Fonteyn at her childhood home at 3 Elm Grove Road, Ealing. Jersey Post also released a set of six commemorative stamps and a miniature sheet honouring Fonteyn in 2019.

== Premiering roles ==
- 1934, "Snowflake", The Nutcracker, debut the Vic-Wells Ballet.
- 1934, "Young Tregennis", The Haunted Ballroom, first solo role.
- 1935, female lead, Les Rendezvous, first leading role.
- 1935, "Young Bride", Le Baiser de la Fée, role created for her by Ashton, first to perform role.
- 1936, "Flower girl", Nocturne, first to dance the role in the debut performance of the ballet.
- 1938, "Odette-Odile", Swan Lake, her debut in the dual role.
- 1940, "Leader of the Children of Light", Dante Sonata, originated the role for the premiere of the ballet.
- 1940, "Bride", The Wise Virgins, first to dance the role in the debut performance of the ballet.
- 1941, "Success", The Wanderer, created the role for the debut performance of the ballet.
- 1941, "Love", Orpheus and Eurydice, first to perform the role in the premiere of the ballet.
- 1942, "Lady", Comus, created the role in Helpmann's first ballet for its debut.
- 1942, "Ophelia", Hamlet, first to dance the role in the world premiere of the ballet.
- 1943, "Una", The Quest, first to dance the role in the debut performance of the ballet.
- 1946, female lead, Symphonic Variations, created the role in the world premiere of the ballet.
- 1946, "La Bolero", Les Sirènes, first to dance the role in the debut performance of the ballet.
- 1947, title role, Mam'zelle Angot, first to perform the role in the debut of the ballet at the Royal Opera House.
- 1948, "Agathe", Les Demoiselles de la Nuit, role was created by Roland Petit for Fonteyn.
- 1948, "La Morte Amoureuse", Don Juan, first to dance the role in the debut performance of the ballet.
- 1949, "Aurora", The Sleeping Beauty, Fonteyn's United States debut.
- 1950, "Lady Dulcinea-Aldonza Lorenzo", Don Quixote, danced the dual role in the world premiere of the ballet.
- 1950, lead female, Ballet Imperial, first to perform the role in the debut of the ballet at the Royal Opera House.
- 1951, "Chloë", Daphnis and Chloe, created the role for the world premiere.
- 1951, female "Tiresias", Tiresias, first to dance the role in the debut performance of the ballet.
- 1952, title role, Sylvia, created the role for the world premiere of the ballet.
- 1953, "Queen of the Air", Homage to the Queen, tribute for the coronation of Queen Elizabeth II, world premiere.
- 1954, "Madame Butterfly", Entrada de Madame Butterfly, created the role in the debut of the ballet at the Jardines del Generalife, in Granada, Spain.
- 1954, title role, The Firebird, Fonteyn's premiere in the role occurred at the Empire Theatre, Edinburgh.
- 1956, female lead, La Péri, first to dance the role in the debut performance of the ballet.
- 1956, female lead, Birthday Offering, first to perform the role in the premiere of the ballet for the 25th anniversary of the Sadler's Wells Ballet Company.
- 1957, "Doll Ballerina", Petrushka, Fonteyn premiered the role in the Royal Ballet company debut.
- 1958, title role, Ondine, Fonteyn originated the role for the world premiere of the ballet.
- 1960, title role, Raymonda "Scène d'amour", Fonteyn debuted the role in the Royal Opera House premiere.
- 1962, title role, Giselle, Fonteyn and Nureyev's partnership debut in Britain.
- 1962, female lead, Le Corsaire Pas de Deux, Fonteyn and Nureyev were the first to perform this duet at the Royal Opera House.
- 1963, title role, Marguerite and Armand, was written for Fonteyn and Nureyev and they performed in the world premiere of the ballet.
- 1963, title role, Giselle, Fonteyn and Nureyev's partnership debut in the United States in New York City.
- 1963, "Nikiya", La Bayadère, choreography revised by Nureyev was premiered by him and Fonteyn.
- 1964, female lead, Divertimento, Fonteyn and Nureyev premiered the ballet in Bath.
- 1965, "Juliet", Romeo and Juliet, Fonteyn and Nureyev performed in the world premiere.
- 1967, "The Woman" (Eve), Paradise Lost, danced by Fonteyn with Nureyev at the world premiere of the ballet.
- 1969, "Mélisande", Pelléas and Mélisande, performed by Fonteyn and Nureyev for the world premiere of the ballet.
- 1972, "The Diva", Poème de l'extase, Fonteyn debuted the role in the first performance of the ballet with the Royal Opera House.
- 1975, female dancer, Floresta Amazonica, Fonteyn and Nureyev debuted the pas de deux written for Fonteyn in New York City.
- 1979, Fonteyn, Salut d'amour à Margot Fonteyn, debut of dance written and performed by Fonteyn and Ashton on her 60th birthday.
- 1984, Fonteyn, Acte de présence, world premiere of the ballet written and performed by Fonteyn and Ashton for the New York City Metropolitan Opera House centennial celebration.

== See also ==
- List of dancers
- Women in dance

Academic offices
Preceded by Malcolm MacDonald	Chancellor of the University of Durham; 1981–1991	Succeeded by Sir Peter Ustinov
