= Romola de Pulszky =

Hungarian aristocrat (1891–1978)

- Born: 20 February 1891; Hungary
- Died: 8 June 1978 (aged 87); London, England
- Other name: Romola Pulszky
- Spouse: Vaslav Nijinsky (m. 1913; died 1950)
- Children: 2

Romola de Pulszky or Romola Pulszky (married name Nijinsky; 20 February 1891 – 8 June 1978) was a Hungarian aristocrat. As a young woman she became interested in dance and Vaslav Nijinsky, the noted premier danseur of the Ballets Russes. They married in Buenos Aires on 10 September 1913 while the company was on tour. They had two daughters, Kyra and Tamara, before he was institutionalized for the remaining 30 years of his life for schizophrenia.

In 1934, Romola de Pulszky published her first biography of Nijinsky, covering his early life and dance career. She discovered his diary, written before he went into an asylum, which she published in a "bowdlerized" version in 1936. She published a biography of her husband's later years in 1952, two years after his death in London.

== Biography ==
Romola de Pulszky was born in Hungary as the second daughter of Emilia Márkus, the most renowned Hungarian actress of her time, and Károly (Charles) Pulszky (1853–1899), a Hungarian politician, member of Parliament and director of the Hungarian National Gallery of Art, related to Hungarian politician and writer Ferenc Pulszky. His family came from Poland and were of French Huguenot descent (de Poulx), but had converted to Catholicism. Her older sister Tereza was called Tessa. Their father went into exile because of a political scandal associated with art purchases for the gallery, first to London and then to Australia. Romola was eight years old when he committed suicide at the age of 45 in Brisbane, Australia. She was deeply disturbed by the loss and resented her mother's remarriage a few years later.

Romola struggled with studies and direction, trying to work at acting but failed. She became engaged to a Hungarian baron at the age of 21, but called it off in 1912 after having seen the Ballets Russes. She decided to shift her focus to the theatrical world of ballet. She was particularly astounded by and attracted to the dancing of Vaslav Nijinsky, as were all of his audiences.

She was fixated on wanting to dance for the Ballets Russes and become close to Nijinsky. For months she traveled on tour in Europe with the Ballets Russes, and gained approval from the troupe's director, Sergei Diaghilev, to take ballet lessons from the company's ballet master, Enrico Cecchetti. Not realizing that he was in an intimate relationship with Diaghilev (who was seventeen years older than Nijinsky), she found it difficult to talk to Nijinsky alone, who was protected by a minder. She eventually got close to him while on a ship headed for South America. Diaghilev had decided against touring with the company and remained in Europe. Days before their arrival to Buenos Aires, Argentina, Nijinsky proposed to Romola and they married in port on 10 September 1913, shortly after they arrived.

Their marriage had severe effects on Nijinsky's career. Romola became pregnant right away, and Nijinsky missed performances due to his own symptoms of couvade syndrome. This was cited as Diaghilev's legal grounds for firing him, which he did via a telegram. He generally did not keep any married dancers in the company.

Romola gave birth to Kyra Nijinsky in Vienna, Austria on 19 June 1914, ten days before the assassination of Archduke Franz Ferdinand of Austria. With the outbreak of war, the newlywed couple and their infant daughter were classified as enemy aliens because of Nijinsky's Russian nationality; they were put on house arrest at the home of Romola's mother, Emilia Markus Pulszky. After two years as war prisoners in Hungary, they gained permission to leave for New York with the aid of Diaghilev and international political leaders. They embarked on a tour of North America, followed by a tour to South America.

During Nijinsky's final three-year engagements with the Ballets Russes, he had struggled to help manage the tours, which caused him a great deal of stress. The family settled in St Moritz, Switzerland until the end of the Great War. Two months after the armistice at the end of World War I, Nijinsky began to exhibit signs of a severe psychosis. He was committed to a series of Swiss mental institutions, and was confined for most of his remaining 30 years. He was treated at Burghölzli and the Bellevue Sanatorium in Kreuzlingen. He was originally diagnosed as schizophrenic by Eugen Bleuler in 1919. He was treated by a number of psychiatrists with minimal results. In 1920, while he was still undergoing treatment, Romola Nijinsky gave birth to their second daughter, Tamara. After Nijinsky became an invalid and institutionalized, Romola shifted from bisexuality and had only lesbian affairs for the rest of her life.

In 1934 she published what would be her first biography of her husband, Nijinsky by Romola Nijinsky. She discovered the diary her husband wrote over a period of six weeks in 1919 before being committed to an asylum in Switzerland. "Nijinsky had long been unreachably psychotic when his wife, Romola, discovered the manuscript in an old trunk, then sanitized and published it to feed the legend of which she had become both guardian and beneficiary." She published a "bowdlerized" version in 1936.

In 1936, she heard about a new treatment for schizophrenia and contacted the founder, Manfred Sakel, to have her husband treated. In 1938, Nijinsky began to receive regular insulin shock therapy (IST) over the course of a year, until the beginning of World War II. Romola spent most of World War II in Budapest with Nijinsky, whose illness was purported to be in partial remission from the IST. Out of concern for her husband's safety after the German invasion of Budapest, Romola took her husband to Sopron, where they stayed until the end of the war.

Kyra Nijinsky became a dancer, specializing in a couple of roles her father had done as well as a new dance by Antony Tudor. In 1936 she married Igor Markevitch, with whom she had a son named for her father, Vaslav Markevitch (20 January 1937 - 12 January 2024). They divorced and Markevitch raised their son. Like her younger sister Tamara, she later emigrated to the United States, settling in the San Francisco area.

Romola sent her younger daughter Tamara Nijinsky to live with her mother in Budapest for some time. She was too young to have seen her father dance, but became executive director of the Vaslav and Romola Nijinsky Foundation (named after her parents), to preserve and promote her father's art, including paintings and drawings he did late in life. She emigrated to the US and settled in Phoenix, Arizona.

Nijinsky died on 8 April 1950 in London, England. In 1952 Romola published her second biography of Nijinsky, called The Last Years of Nijinsky. Romola Nijinsky died in Paris on 9 September 1978.

In 1995, an unexpurgated English edition was published of The Diary of Vaslav Nijinsky, edited by Joan Acocella, a professional writer about dance, and in a new translation by Kyril FitzLyon. The New York Times review said that this edition showed that his original diary was severely "bowdlerized" by his wife in the versions she published in 1936 and later. His diary reflected the decline of his household into chaos before he was committed to an asylum. He elevated feeling and action in his writing. A New York Times review said, "How ironic that in erasing the real ugliness of his insanity, the old version silenced not only Nijinsky's true voice but the magnificently gifted body from which it came. And how fortunate we are to have them both restored." This version inspired new artistic works - three plays in 1998 alone.

== Works ==
- Nijinsky by Romola Nijinsky (1934), introduction by Paul Claudel, ghostwritten by Lincoln Kirstein
- Nijinsky's Diary (1936), edited Romola Nijinsky
- The Last Years of Nijinsky (1952)

== Cultural depictions ==
=== In plays ===
- Nijinsky: God's Mad Clown (1986) by Glenn J. Blumstein.
- David Pownall's Death of a Faun (1998) used the death of impresario Sergei Diaghilev as a catalyst to rouse Nijinsky out of a Swiss sanatorium "to pay tribute". Nicholas Johnson, a Royal Ballet dancer, portrayed the schizophrenic Nijinsky.
- Dancer Leonard Crofoot wrote Nijinsky Speaks (1998) as a monologue spanning the dancer's career, with quotes from Diary of Vaslav Nijinsky (1995); he played the role of Nijinsky and did his own brief episodes of dancing.
- Norman Allen's Nijinsky's Last Dance (1998) featured a solo actor, Jeremy Davidson, to portray the dancer, who tells his story by monologue in an asylum.
- Romola & Nijinsky (Deux Mariages) (2003) by Lynne Alvarez was first produced by Primary Stages (Casey Childs, Executive Producer; Andrew Leynse, Artistic Director; Robert La Fosse, choreographer).

=== In film ===
- The Dancer (planned film, 1970). The screenplay was written by playwright Edward Albee. The film was to be directed by Tony Richardson and star Rudolf Nureyev as Nijinsky, Claude Jade as Romola and Paul Scofield as Diaghilev, but producer Harry Saltzman canceled the project during pre-production.
- Nijinsky (1980), directed by Herbert Ross, starring professional dancers George de la Peña as Nijinsky and Leslie Browne as Romola, with Alan Bates as Diaghilev and Jeremy Irons as Fokine. Romola Nijinsky had a writing credit for the film.
- The Diaries of Vaslav Nijinsky (2001), written, directed, shot and edited by Paul Cox. The screenplay was based on Nijinsky's diaries, with the speeches read over related imagery by Derek Jacobi. The subject matter included his work, his illness, and his relationships with Diaghilev and Romola. Several Leigh Warren Dancers portrayed the dancer.
- Riot at the Rite (2005), a BBC TV movie, written by Kevin Elyot and directed by Andy Wilson, portraying the rehearsal and premiere of Igor Stravinsky's Rite of Spring at the Théâtre des Champs-Élysées in Paris. The role of Romola is played by Emma Pierson.
- Vaslav (2010) is a film about Nijinsky's life, including his marriage, with screenplay by Dutch novelist Arthur Japin.
