= Hus (surname) =

Hus is a surname. Notable people with the surname include:

- Jan Hus (c. 1360–1415), Czech Catholic priest, philosopher, reformer, and master at Charles University in Prague; burned at the stake for heresy
- Adélaïde-Louise-Pauline Hus (1734–1805), French stage actress
- Berendt Hus (c. 1630–1676), German pipe organ builder
- Charles Hus, dit Millet (1738–1802), political figure in Lower Canada
- Eugène Hus (1758–1823), born Pierre-Louis Stapleton, Franco-Belgian ballet dancer and choreographer
- François Hus (1695–c. 1774), French comedian
- Françoise Hus (1710–c. 1780), French stage actress
- Jean-Baptiste Hus (1736–1805), French ballet dancer and ballet master
- Jorgen Hus (born 1989), Canadian football long snapper
- Sophie Hus (1758–1831), French stage actress
- Tim Hus, Canadian country-folk singer
- Walter Hus (born 1959), Belgian composer and musician

== See also ==
- Hus family, an 18th-century French dynasty of ballet dancers and actors
