= Desforges =

Desforges may refer to:

- Desforges (surname), a French surname
- Desforges, pen name of Pierre Jean Baptiste Choudard Desforges (1746–1806), French actor, dramatist, librettist and man of letters
- 10830 Desforges, a main-belt asteroid
