= Benoit Tranquille Berbiguier =

French composer

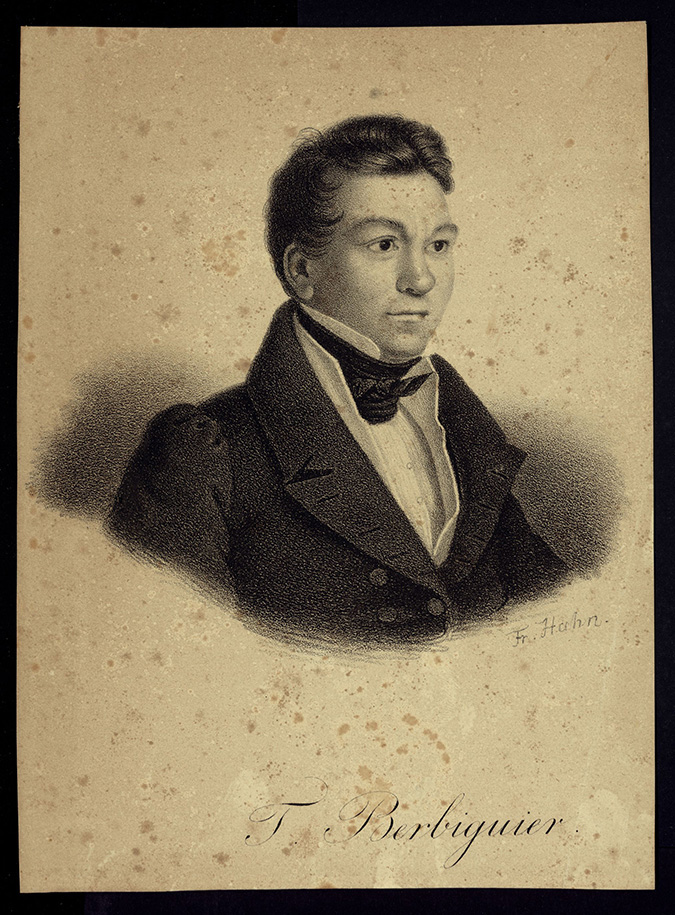
- Lithograph of Benoit Tranquille Berbiguier
- Born: Antoine Benoît Tranquille Berbiguier; 21 December 1782; Caderousse
- Died: 20 January 1835 (aged 52); Pontlevoy
- Occupation(s): Flautist; Composer
- Years active: 1805 – 1830

Antoine Benoit Tranquille Berbiguier (21 December 1782 – 20 January 1835) was an early 19th-century French flautist, pedagog and composer.

== Biography ==
Still very young, Berbiguier learned to play the Western concert flute, violin and cello. In 1805 at the age of 23, he left the family home against the will of his parents who intended him to be a lawyer. In order to study, he joined the Conservatoire National de Musique de Paris where he entered the course of flautist Johann Georg Wunderlich and that of Henri Montan Berton for harmony.

Since one of his friends, Pierre-Louis Hus-Desforges, was a cellist, Berbiguier composed numerous duets for flute and cello. He also wrote fifteen duets, seven concerts, six solos and seven great sonatas, as well as variations, fantasies, trios and romances. In 1813 he joined the army and in 1819, when he became a lieutenant, he resigned. In 1830, he settled in Pontlevoy where he met again Pierre-Louis Hus-Desforges. His studies for the flute were published around 1818, some of them are still used today for learning the instrument.

== Selected works ==
- 18 exercices pour la flûte traversière
- 7 duos, op. 28
- Duo, op. 76 n° 1
- 3 grands duos, op. 61
- 6 duos, op. 59
- 21 duos simples
- Ouverture of opera Semiramide by Gioacchino Rossini, arrangement for 3 flutes
- Méthode de flûte traversière
- Solo pour flûte
- Grandes études caractéristiques
- Nouvelle Méthode pour la Flûte

== Bibliography ==
- Jules Courtet, Dictionnaire géographique, géologique, historique, archéologique et biographique du département du Vaucluse, Avignon, 1876.
- Adolph Goldberg: Porträts und Biographien hervorragender Flöten-Virtuosen, -Dilettanten und -Komponisten. Berlin 1906, Moeck, Celle 1987 (Reprint). ISBN 3-87549-028-2
- Ursula Pešek, Željiko Pešek: Flötenmusik aus drei Jahrhunderten. Bärenreiter, Kassel 1990. ISBN 3-7618-0985-9
