= Desforges (surname) =

Desforges is a French surname. Notable people with the surname include:

- Émilie Desforges (born 1983), Canadian alpine skier
- Fannie Desforges, Canadian ice hockey player
- Pierre Desforges Sam, Haitian diplomat

== See also ==
- Barthélemy Hus-Desforges (1699–1786), French comedian
- Pierre-Louis Hus-Desforges (1773–1838), French classical cellist, composer and conductor
