= Géologique de Pontlevoy Regional Nature Reserve =

French regional nature reserve and fossil site

- IUCN category III (natural monument or feature)
- Interactive map of Géologique de Pontlevoy Regional Nature Reserve
- Location: Loir-et-Cher, France
- Nearest city: Pontlevoy
- Coordinates: 47.3974°N 1.2631°E
- Area: 312 ha (770 acres)
- Established: 15 April 2011
- Governing body: C.D.P.N.E. Loir-et-Cher

Pontlevoy Geologic Formation
- Stratigraphic range: Langhian
- Type: Fossil site

Lithology
- Primary: Limestone

Location
- Coordinates: 47.3974°N 1.2631°E
- Region: Centre-Val de Loire
- Country: France

Type section
- Named for: Pontlevoy
- Géologique de Pontlevoy Regional Nature Reserve (France)

The Géologique de Pontlevoy Regional Nature Reserve is a regional nature reserve located in the Centre-Val de Loire region of France. Established in 2011, it spreads over 1.91 hectares (4.7 acres) and protects a former Beauce limestone quarry preserving faluns.

== Location ==
The territory of the nature reserve is in the Loir-et-Cher department, in the domain of the Pontlevoy commune. It is located in the north of the commune, along the D764. Its small size makes it the fourteenth smallest nature reserve in France.

== History of the site and reserve ==
The site was initially established as a voluntary nature reserve in 1979.

== Ecology (biodiversity, ecological interest, etc.) ==
The site interest is mostly geological and paleontological. It consists of a Beauce limestone quarry whose banks are sometimes covered in faluns. Those deposited at the bottom of a warm and shallow sea at the beginning of the middle Miocene (Langhian), approximately between 16 and 14 Ma. The site presents a large fossil diversity.

== Geology ==
The site bears Langhian faluns, Burdigalian sands and marls, and Aquitanian limestone.

== Touristic and educational interest ==
Guided tours are offered to visitors by the C.D.P.N.E.. The site is equipped with markings. It allows to observe the coalface and its different layers : faluns, grey sands and limestone.

== Administration, management plan, regulations ==
Local administration and reserve gestion were placed under responsibility of the C.D.P.N.E. Loir-et-Cher, 34 avenue Maunoury, 41000 Blois Cedex.

=== Tools and legal status ===
The voluntary nature reserve was originally established the 21 September 1986. Its regional nature reserve status was created under deliberation of the Regional Council the 15 April 2011. After a public consultation in 2019, the domain was extended to 1.91 ha in 2020.
