= Alexandra Balashova =

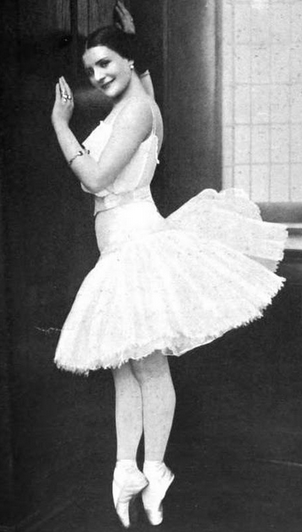
- Alexandra Balashova, from a 1912 publication
- Born: 3 May 1887; Moscow, Russian Empire
- Died: 5 January 1979 (aged 91); Paris, France
- Spouse: Alexei K. Ushkov

Alexandra Mikhailovna Balashova (Russian: Александра Михайловна Балашова; 3 May 1887 — 5 January 1979), also seen as Aleksandra Balashova or Alexandra Balachova, was a Russian ballet dancer, and later a dance teacher and choreographer.

== Early life ==
Alexandra Balashova was born in Moscow. She was educated at the Bolshoi Theatre Ballet School.

== Career ==
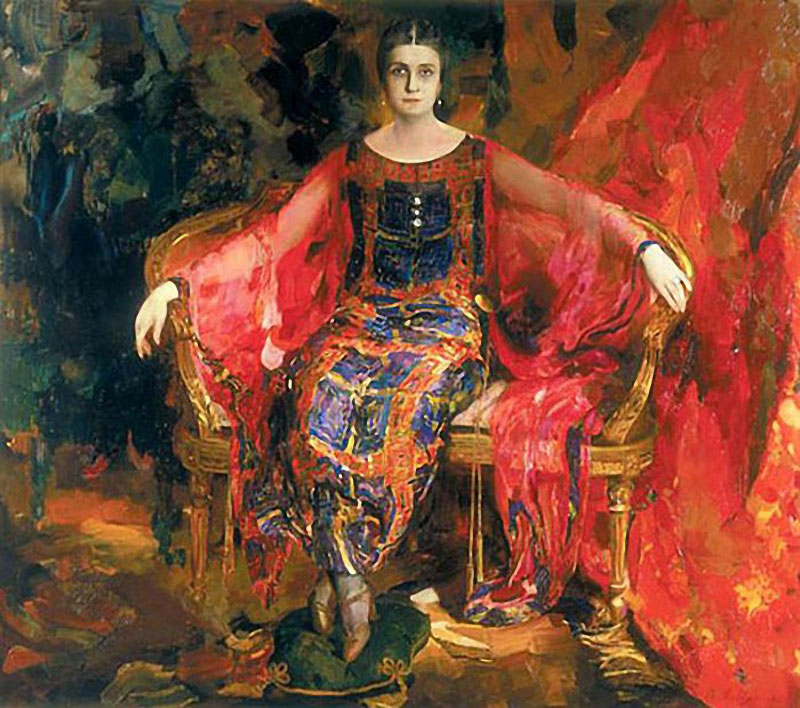
Alexandra Balashova by F. Malyavin (1924)

Balashova was a principal dancer at the Bolshoi Theatre starting in 1905. She often danced with Mikhail Mordkin, and was known for such roles as Aurora in The Sleeping Beauty and Odette/Odille in Swan Lake. She performed in London in 1911, replacing Yekaterina Geltzer; for publicity, London bootmakers were challenged to fit "her marvelous instep" from their stock. She left Russia in 1921 and danced for about ten more years in Western Europe, then taught, while living in France. Among her students was dance notation expert Jacqueline Challet-Haas. In 1946 Balashova was credited as choreographer on a production of La fille mal gardée in London.

Russian artist Filipp Malyavin painted her portrait in 1924, when they were both living in Paris.

== Personal life ==
Balashova married Alexei K. Ushkov as his second wife. They left Russia in 1921, taking a residence in Isadora Duncan's former apartment in Paris. Balashova died in 1979, aged 91, in a rest home near Paris. There is a box of her papers, mostly correspondence and photographs, at Amherst University.
