= La fille mal gardée =

1789 comic ballet by Jean Dauberval

The Wayward Daughter
- Nadia Nerina (as Lise) and David Blair (as Colas) in the Pas de ruban from the premiere of Frederick Ashton's version, London, 1960
- Native title: La fille mal gardée
- Choreographer: Jean Dauberval
- Premiere: 1 July 1789; Grand Théâtre de Bordeaux, Bordeaux, France
- Genre: Comic ballet

La fille mal gardée (French pronunciation: [la fij mal ɡaʁde]; French for The Wayward Daughter, literal translation: "The Poorly Guarded Girl" and also known as The Girl Who Needed Watching) is a comic ballet presented in two acts, inspired by Pierre-Antoine Baudouin's 1765 painting, La réprimande/Une jeune fille querellée par sa mère. The ballet was originally choreographed by the ballet master Jean Dauberval to a pastiche of music based on fifty-five popular French airs. The ballet was premiered on 1 July 1789 at the Grand Théâtre de Bordeaux in Bordeaux, France under the title Le ballet de la paille, ou Il n'est qu'un pas du mal au bien (The Ballet of Straw, or There is Only One Step from Bad to Good).

La fille mal gardée is one of the oldest and most important works in the modern ballet repertory, having been kept alive throughout its long performance history by way of many revivals. The work has undergone many changes of title and has had no fewer than six scores, some of which were adaptations of older music.

Today La fille mal gardée is normally presented in one of two different versions: many ballet companies feature productions which are derived from Alexander Gorsky's version to the music of Peter Ludwig Hertel, originally staged for the Bolshoi Theatre in Moscow in 1903. Gorsky's version was almost entirely based on Marius Petipa and Lev Ivanov's 1885 staging for the Imperial Ballet of Saint Petersburg. The Petipa/Ivanov staging was itself based on Paul Taglioni's version to the music of Hertel, originally staged in 1864 for the Court Opera Ballet of the Königliches Opernhaus in Berlin. Modern audiences are perhaps most familiar with the production staged by Frederick Ashton for the Royal Ballet in 1960. La fille mal gardée has a popularity that has established it in the repertory of many ballet companies all over the world.

== The origins of La fille mal gardée ==
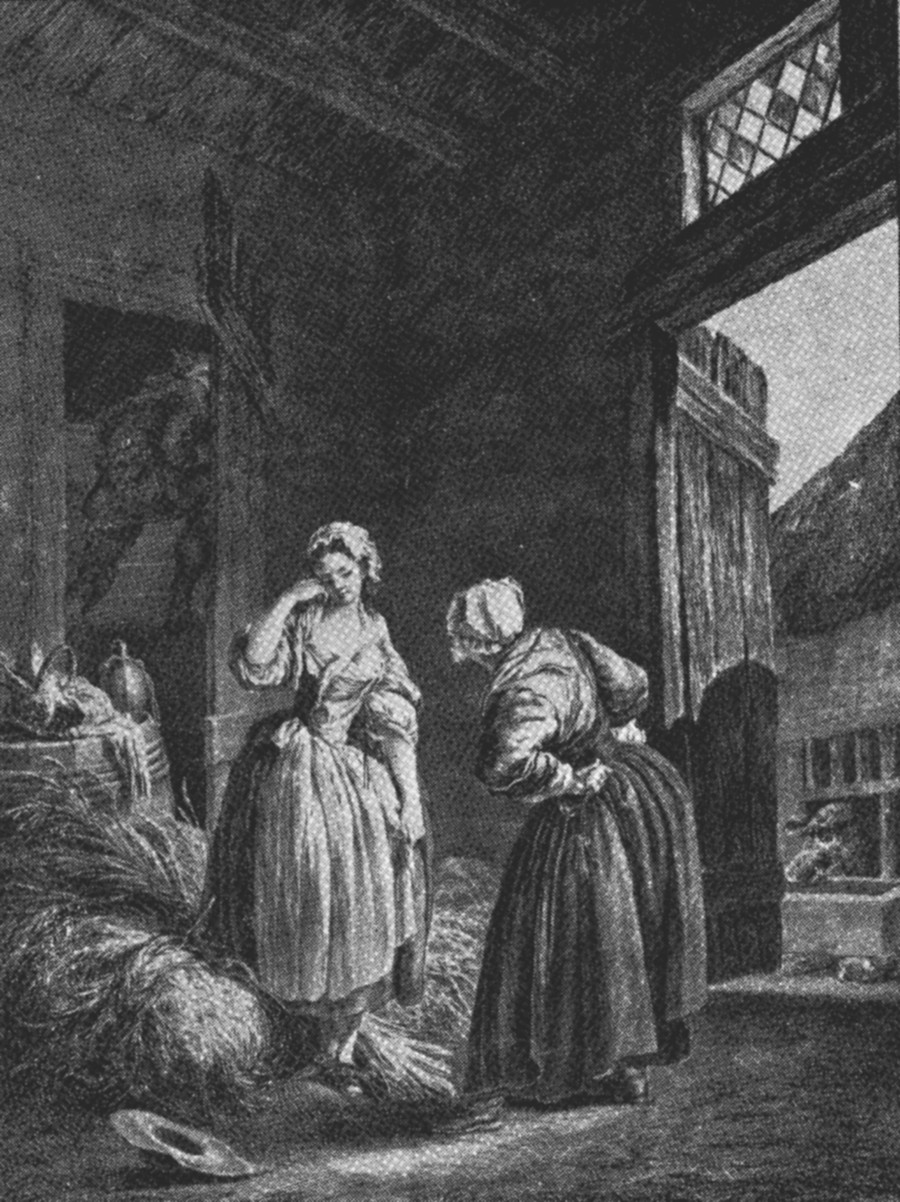
Pierre-Antoine Baudouin's painting Le reprimande/Une jeune fille querellée par sa mère

La fille mal gardée was the creation of Jean Dauberval, one of the greatest choreographers of his day. He was trained under the influential teacher Jean-Georges Noverre and is further distinguished as the teacher of Charles Didelot, known today as "The Father of Russian Ballet". Legend has it that Dauberval found his inspiration for La fille mal gardée while in a Bordeaux print shop, where he viewed an engraving of Pierre-Antoine Baudouin's painting Le reprimande/Une jeune fille querellée par sa mère. The painting showed a girl in tears with her clothes disarrayed being berated by an old woman (presumably her mother) in a hay barn, while her lover can be seen in the background scurrying up the stairs to the safety of the loft. This quaint work of art amused Dauberval so much that he immediately set out to craft a suitable scenario for a ballet.

The ballet was first presented at the Grand Théâtre de Bordeaux in Bordeaux, France, on 1 July 1789. Dauberval's wife, Marie-Madeleine Crespé (better known as Mademoiselle Théodore), created the role of Lison (or Lise, as the character is known in modern versions), Eugène Hus created the role of Colin (or Colas), and François Le Riche created the role of the Widow Ragotte (now known as Widow Simone in modern versions).

The ballet's original title was Le ballet de la paille, ou Il n'est qu'un pas du mal au bien ("The Ballet of the Straw, or There is Only One Step from Bad to Good"). The work met with public success and proved to be Dauberval's most popular and enduring work.

=== The music ===
In the late 18th and early 19th centuries scores for ballets were often patchworks (or a pastiche) of popular airs derived from well-known dances, songs and/or operas. These scores were often arranged and adapted by either the theatre's director of music or by the lead violinist of the opera house's orchestra, who at the time also served as conductor (the separate role of orchestral conductor was not yet established).

The 1789 score for La fille mal gardée was itself an arrangement of fifty-five popular French airs. The surviving orchestral parts of the 1789 score do not list a composer/arranger, and no extant contemporary account of the original production mentions a composer. It is possible that Dauberval himself arranged the score, for he certainly devised the ballet's scenario and was a competent violinist. If it was not his work, then it may have been one of the musicians employed by the theatre.

=== Revivals of Dauberval's original version ===
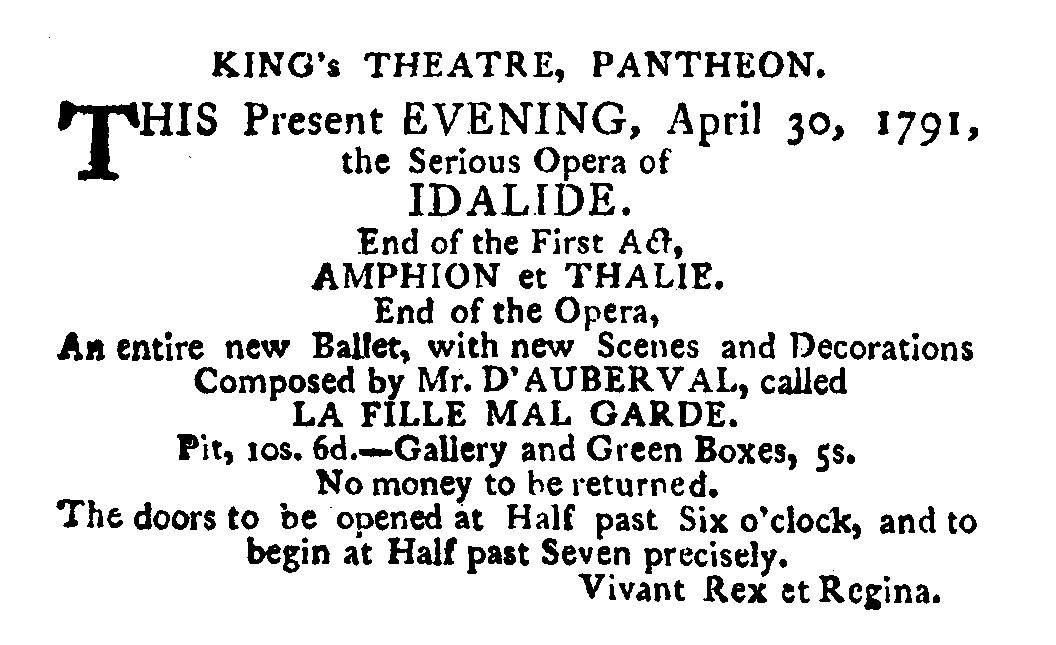
Announcement for the premiere of La fille mal gardée at the Pantheon, London, 1791

Two years after the premiere, Dauberval travelled to London to mount the work for the Ballet of the King's Pantheon Theatre, and for the occasion he changed the title of the ballet to La fille mal gardée, as the ballet is now commonly known. For the first performance on 30 April 1791, Dauberval's wife Mme. Théodore reprised her role as Lise, while Dauberval's student, Charles Didelot danced Colas.

The 1789 score was loathed by the musicians of the Pantheon Theatre Orchestra. When the orchestral parts were rediscovered in 1959 by the ballet historian and musicologist Ivor Guest and the conductor John Lanchbery, they were found to be covered with comments ranging from the witty to the crude. In the original manuscript the title of the ballet was sprawled atop the pages. The lead violinist of the first London performance crossed out the title, and in its place wrote "Filly-Me-Gardy".

Eugène Hus, creator of the role of Colas, staged Dauberval's La fille mal gardée in 1803 at the old Paris Opéra, the Salle de la rue de Richelieu, predecessor of the Salle Le Peletier. Prior to this production, Hus utilised the ballet's libretto in 1796 for a comic opera titled Lise et Colin, which was set to the music of Pierre Gaveaux.

== Jean-Pierre Aumer's new version to the music of Hérold ==
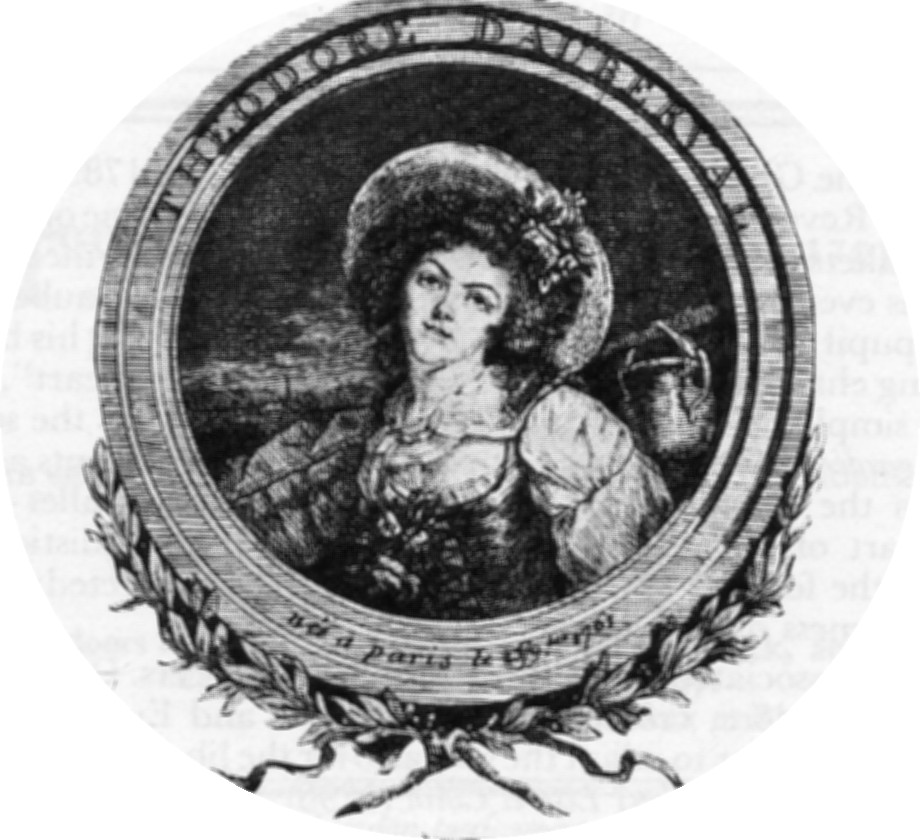
Mme. Théodore Dauberval, creator of the role of Lise; Paris, 1761

The choreographer Jean-Pierre Aumer, a student of Dauberval, continuously revised Hus's 1803 production throughout his career as ballet master at the Paris Opéra. He then travelled to Vienna in 1809 to mount the work for the Ballett des imperialen Hoftheater nächst der Burg.

On 17 November 1828, Aumer presented a completely new version of La fille mal gardée at the Paris Opéra especially for the Ballerina Pauline Montessu. For this revival the composer Ferdinand Hérold created an adaptation of the original score of 1789. Hérold also borrowed many themes from the operas of such composers as Jean-Paul-Égide Martini and Gaetano Donizetti.

=== The Fanny Elssler pas de deux ===
In 1837, the great Austrian Ballerina Fanny Elssler made her debut at the Paris Opéra as Lise in Aumer's production of La fille mal gardée. It was the custom of the time that when a ballerina appeared in an already-existing role, she would request a new Grand pas with variations from the Ballet Master as a novelty for her own performances. For her appearance in La fille mal gardée, Elssler performed a new Grand pas that was specially arranged for her by Aimé Leborne, the Paris Opéra's chief bibliothécaire (librarian). Leborne arranged the pas from airs derived from Donizetti's famous opera L'elisir d'amore.

While researching materials pertaining to La fille mal gardée at the Bibliothèque nationale de France for Ashton's production, the historian and musicologist Ivor Guest accidentally rediscovered Elssler's Grand pas from 1837. The music was in the form of a rehearsal répétiteur in an old, dusty box of music. Since the material used for Ashton's version did not include a classical pas de deux for the main characters, Ashton was pleased that Guest was able to rediscover such a rarity. Re-christened as the "Fanny Elssler pas de deux", it went on to become one of the most celebrated pieces in all of classical ballet.

== Paul Taglioni's new version to the music of Hertel ==
The Italian choreographer Paul Taglioni, brother of the legendary Marie, was engaged as ballet master to the Court Opera Ballet of the Königliches Opernhaus in Berlin from 1852 to 1866. On 7 November 1864, Taglioni presented his own completely new staging of La fille mal gardée under the title Das schlecht bewachte Mädchen (The Badly Guarded Girl). For this production Taglioni commissioned an entirely new score from the Königliches Opernhaus's resident composer of ballet music Peter Ludwig Hertel. This production premiered to a resounding success, and was retained in the company's repertory for many years.

In May 1876, the Italian ballerina Virginia Zucchi made her debut in Taglioni's production in Berlin. The celebrated ballerina triumphed in the role of Lise, revitalising the work with her expressive portrayal.

== La fille mal gardée in Russia ==
In Russia, La fille mal gardée (Russian: Тщетная предосторожность) was staged for the first time by the ballet master Giuseppe Solomoni in 1800 for Michael Maddox's Petrovsky Theatre (the predecessor of the Bolshoi Theatre) in Moscow, a production that was later revised by Solomoni's successor Jean Lamiral in 1808. Both productions utilised the original pastiche score of 1789, perhaps in adaptations prepared for each respective staging.

The first production of La fille mal gardée to be performed by the Saint Petersburg Imperial Ballet was staged by Jean Dauberval's student Charles Didelot, who performed the role of Colas in the London revival of 1791. Didelot—who served as maître de ballet to the Saint Petersburg Imperial Theatres from 1801 until 1811 and from 1816 to 1837—presented his version of La fille mal gardée on 2 October [O.S. 20 September] 1818 at the Imperial Bolshoi Kamenny Theatre, under the title La précaution inutile, ou Lise et Colin (Vain Precaution, or Lise and Colin). The work was set to music by the composer Catterino Cavos.

A production of Jean-Pierre Aumer's 1828 version of La fille mal gardée, set to the music of Hérold, was first staged in Russia at the Moscow Bolshoi Theatre in 1845 by the ballet master Irakly Nikitin. The great choreographer Jules Perrot—premier maître de ballet of the Saint Petersburg Imperial Theatres from 1850 to 1859—staged his own version of Aumer's production for the company in 1854, and for this production added new music to the ballet by the composer Cesare Pugni. Perrot's staging was given for the last time in 1880 for a benefit performance for the Imperial Ballet's premier danseur Pavel Gerdt.

=== Marius Petipa and Lev Ivanov's revival ===
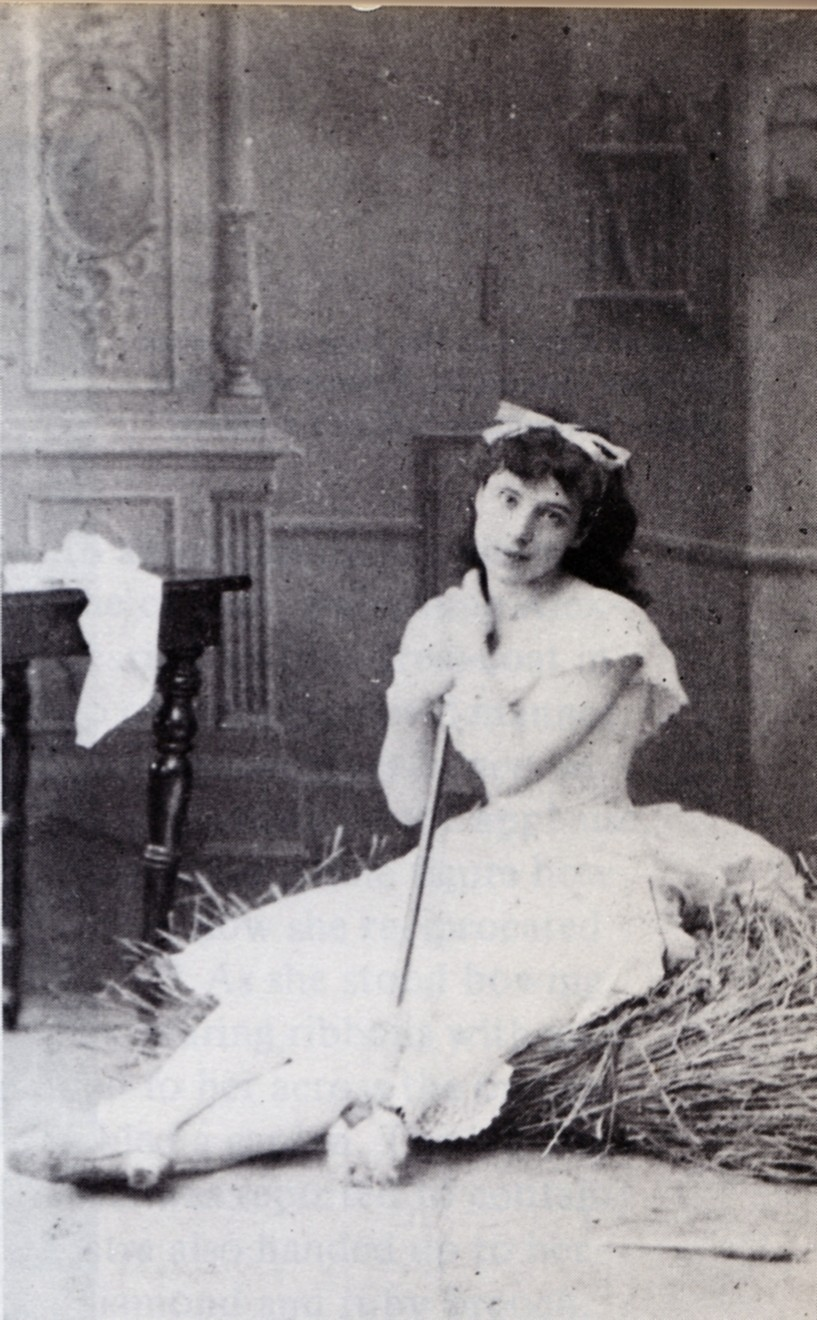
Virginia Zucchi as Lise in Marius Petipa and Lev Ivanov's revival of La fille mal gardée, Saint Petersburg, 1885

The great Italian ballerina Virginia Zucchi toured Saint Petersburg in 1885, performing successfully in different works at various theatres throughout the Imperial capital. In August of that year Emperor Alexander III requested that the Imperial Theatre's director Ivan Vsevolozhsky invite Zucchi to perform with the Imperial Ballet. Zucchi agreed, and chose Paul Taglioni's 1864 version of La fille mal gardée to the music of Hertel for her début. The director Vsevolozhsky was required to pay an extremely high price to obtain Hertel's score from Berlin, while Zucchi herself commanded large fees plus a benefit performance in her contract.

The production of La fille mal gardée was staged jointly by the Imperial Ballet's premier maître de ballet Marius Petipa and the company's régisseur and second ballet master Lev Ivanov, while Zucchi herself would assist with staging some of the dances she had known from Paul Taglioni's version. The production also incorporated dances from the Imperial Ballet's old production to the music of Hérold. The reasons for the joint staging by both Petipa and Ivanov are not entirely clear, though it may be due to the fact that Ivanov was needed to stage the numbers brought out from the old production of the ballet. Petipa was responsible for the setting of all of the new dances, and even commissioned the composer Ludwig Minkus to score music for two additional variations for Zucchi.

The production premiered under its traditional title in Russia La précaution inutile (Vain Precaution) on 28 December [O.S. 16 December] 1885. Zucchi's performance as Lise instantly became a legend in Russia, where she was soon known as "The Divine Virginia". During the famous mimed scene known as "When I'm Married", contemporary accounts tell us that Zucchi's performance made such an impression that it brought many in the audience to tears. The ballerina was much celebrated for the famous Pas de ruban, for which Lise and Colas dance a pas elaborated by the use of ribbons, with Colas pretending to be a horse and Lise running along.

After Zucchi left the Imperial stage, Lev Ivanov mounted an abridged version of La fille mal gardée for performances at the Imperial Theatre of Krasnoe Selo in the summer of 1888. The role of Lise was performed by the ballerina Alexandra Vinogradova, who reprised the role in October of that same year on the stage of the Mariinsky Theatre (principal theatre of the Imperial Ballet and Opera from 1886). This was the last performance of the ballet until 1894, when Ivanov again revived the ballet for the visiting German ballerina Hedwige Hantenbürg. Thereafter the work found a permanent place in the Imperial Ballet's repertory.

La fille mal gardée proved to be a useful vehicle for the great ballerinas of the old Imperial stage, most notably Olga Preobrajenskaya, Anna Pavlova and Tamara Karsavina. For some time the renowned ballerina Mathilde Kschessinskaya did not allow any other danseuse to perform the role of Lise.

A feature of the Ivanov production was the use of live chickens on stage. One evening when Preobrajenskaya danced the role of Lise, her rival Kschessinskaya let all of the chickens out of their coops during her variation, with many of them landing in the orchestra pit and even on the laps of many of the musicians. Preobrajenskaya kept on dancing as if nothing happened.

The difficulties brought upon the Russian ballet as a result of the 1917 revolution caused a substantial number of works in the Imperial Ballet's repertory to cease being performed and eventually become lost. The Imperial Ballet's production of La fille mal gardée was performed for the last time on 10 October [O.S. 27 September] 1917, only one month prior to the October Revolution, with the ballerina Elsa Vill as Lise.

=== Notation of the Imperial Ballet's production ===
As with many of the works that comprised the Saint Petersburg Imperial Ballet's repertory at the turn of the 20th century, the Petipa/Ivanov/Hertel production of La fille mal gardée was notated in the Stepanov method of choreographic notation by the company's régisseur Nicholas Sergeyev and his team of notators. Sergeyev brought these notations with him when he left Russia in 1917 and utilised them to mount such ballets as the Petipa/Ivanov Swan Lake, Petipa's The Sleeping Beauty, the Imperial Ballet's original 1892 The Nutcracker, the Petipa/Ivanov/Cecchetti Coppélia, and Petipa's definitive Giselle for the first time outside of Russia, primarily for the Royal Ballet.

Today all of these notations, including those for the Imperial Ballet's production of La fille mal gardée, are part of a collection known as the Sergeyev Collection, which is today housed in the theatre collection of the Harvard University Library. In 2015 the choreographer and historian Sergei Vikharev staged a production of La fille mal gardée for the State Ballet of Ekaterinburg that utilized the notation from the Sergeyev Collection. The production premiered on 15 May 2015 at the Ekaterinburg State Academic Opera and Ballet Theatre.

== La fille mal gardée in the 20th century ==
=== Alexander Gorsky's revival ===
On 20 December [O.S. 7 December] 1903, an important revival of La fille mal gardée premiered at the Imperial Bolshoi Theatre in Moscow. This version was staged by Alexander Gorsky, a former danseur of the Saint Petersburg Imperial Theatres who served as premier maître de ballet of the Moscow troupe. Gorsky's 1903 version was based on the Petipa/Ivanov production that he learned during his career in Saint Petersburg. Gorsky's version used much additional music added to the score of Hertel, including pieces by Cesare Pugni, Ludwig Minkus, Léo Delibes, Riccardo Drigo and Anton Rubinstein. It is this version of La fille mal gardée that would eventually serve as the basis for nearly every production mounted in Russia, Europe and the Americas for many decades. Gorsky's version of the grand pas de deux from the second act, loosely known as La fille mal gardée pas de deux, is now a famous repertory excerpt on the gala and competition circuit, and is still performed regularly by the Vaganova School as part of their annual graduation performances at the Mariinsky Theatre.

=== Soviet-era productions ===
Final scene from act 2 of the Kirov/Mariinsky Ballet's revival of La fille mal gardée, Saint Petersburg, 1994

In 1930 the choreographers Asaf Messerer and Igor Moiseyev mounted a new version La fille mal gardée for the Bolshoi Ballet, which was based on the 1903 edition by Gorsky. For this production Messerer and Moiseyev added a new act to the ballet titled The Wedding of Lise and Colas, set to an arrangement of music taken from Glinka's Orpheus. Messerer and Moiseyev's version remained in the Bolshoi Theatre's repertory for only two years, and was then revived under the title The Rivals in 1935, with the Hertel/Glinka music revised by the conductor Alexander Mosolov. This version was given only eighteen performances and then dropped from the repertory altogether.

The Bolshoi presented yet another revival of La fille mal gardée in 1937, in a completely new version staged by the choreographer Leonid Lavrovsky. For this production Lavrovsky commissioned the composer Pavel Feldt to create a new score based on the traditional music of Hertel, which included all of the interpolated music the score acquired via Gorsky's revival. After eleven performances Lavrovsky's production was taken out of the Bolshoi Theatre's regular repertory, only to be presented at irregular intervals until the early 1970s. From then on the production was relegated only to occasional performances given by the top graduates of the Bolshoi Ballet Academy.

In 1989 the Kirov/Mariinsky Ballet's director Oleg Vinogradov mounted a new version of the ballet for the Kirov Ballet, largely based on the traditional Petipa/Ivanov/Gorsky productions from the turn of the 20th century. In spite of being a great success, Vinogradov's production was taken out of the repertory after his departure as director of the Kirov/Mariinsky Ballet in 1995, and to date the company has no production of the full-length work in their repertory.

== La fille mal gardée in the West ==
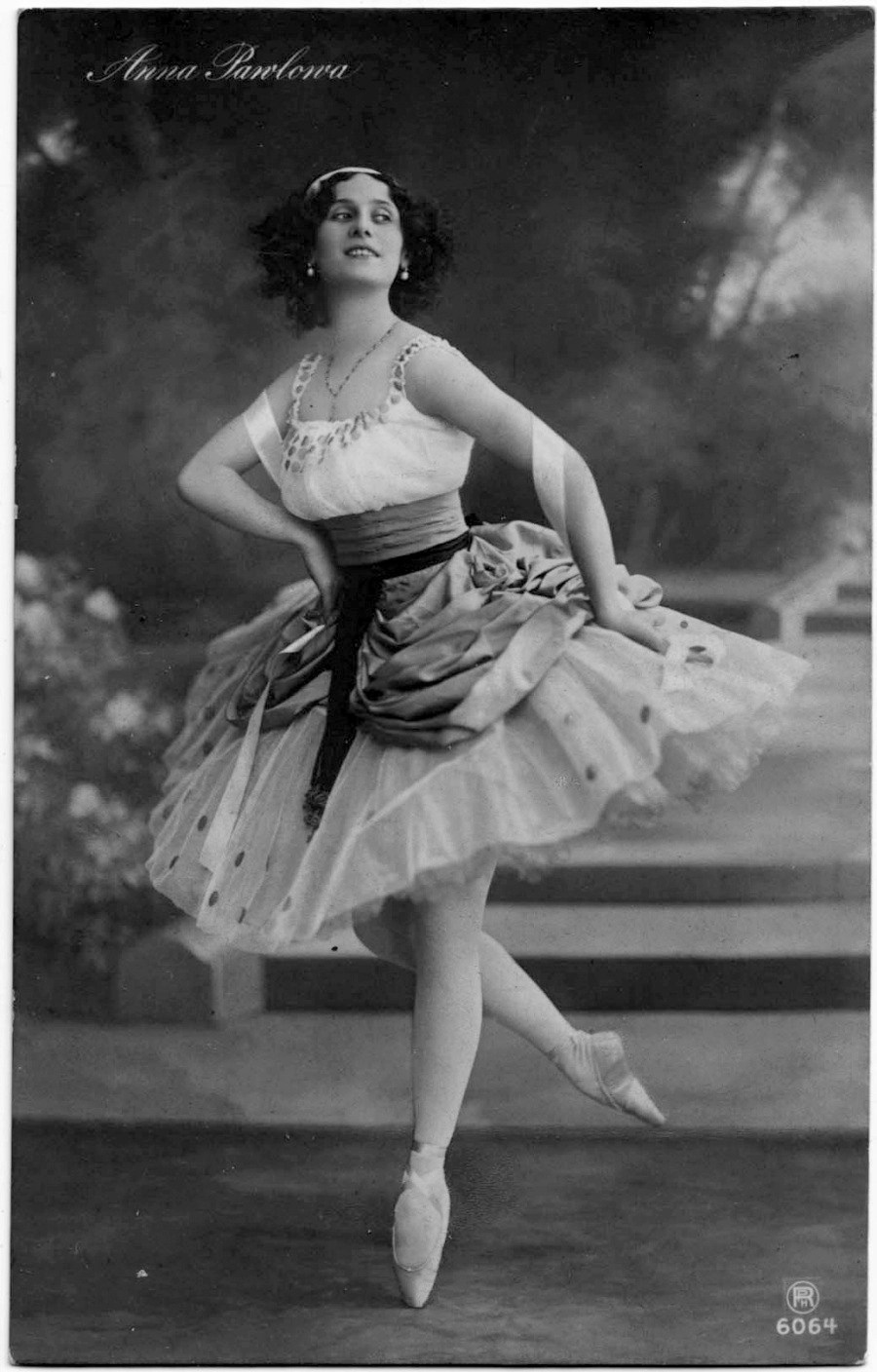
Anna Pavlova in La fille mal gardée, 1912

The first performances of any Russian version of La fille mal gardée (i.e., derived from Petipa and Ivanov's revivals) in the West were presented by the touring company of the legendary ballerina Anna Pavlova, one of the most celebrated interpreters of the role of Lise, who while touring London in 1912 performed in an abridged version of the ballet.

Bronislava Nijinska staged the first production of La fille mal gardée in the United States for American Ballet Theatre (then known as the Ballet Theatre) in 1940, a version based on the Petipa/Ivanov/Gorsky version to the music of Hertel. The original ABT cast included Patricia Bowman as Lisette and Yurek Shabelevsky as Colas. Nijinska's version was revived in 1941 under the title The Wayward Daughter and in 1942 under the title Naughty Lisette. The 1942 production was revised by Dimitri Romanoff in 1949 and was retained in the repertory of the company for many years. Romanoff returned to stage a new version of the ballet for the company in 1972, with Natalia Makarova as Lise. The Romanoff production proved to be a popular piece in the repertory of American Ballet Theatre, who retained the production until 1984. Many famous dancers such as Mikhail Baryshnikov, Gelsey Kirkland, Susan Jaffe, Cynthia Gregory, Fernando Bujones and Marianna Tcherkassky triumphed in the lead roles. Today the company includes Sir Frederick Ashton's version in their active repertory (originally staged for the Royal Ballet in 1960), though the so-called La fille mal gardée pas de deux derived from the old version is often performed during gala performances.

In 1942 the Ballet Russe de Monte-Carlo presented their first production of La fille mal gardée, staged by the former ballerina of the Imperial Ballet Alexandra Balachova in a version largely based on Alexander Gorsky's production derived from the Petipa/Ivanov staging of the late 19th century.

Many of the dancers who worked with the Ballet Russe de Monte Carlo went on to have successful careers as choreographers, teachers and balletmasters abroad, and would use Balachova's version as a basis for many revivals throughout the world. The celebrated ballerina Alicia Alonso danced Balachova's staging of La fille mal gardée throughout the 1940s and 1950s and she would go on to stage her own version of the work for the Cuban Ballet in 1964. As a result, the majority of ballet companies in the Caribbean and South America regularly perform productions derived from Alonso's staging to the music of Hertel.

In 1985 Claude Bessy staged her version of La fille mal gardée for the Ballet School of the Paris Opéra, a production inspired by the 1972 version of Dimitri Romanoff for American Ballet Theatre. For this production Bessy used Hertel's 1864 score in an orchestration by the Paris Opéra's conductor Jean-Michel Damase.

== Frederick Ashton's Royal Ballet production ==
Sarah Lamb (as Lise) and Martin Harvey (as Colas) in the Fanny Elssler pas de deux from Ashton's La fille mal gardée, London, 2005

In 1959, the choreographer Frederick Ashton began creating a completely new version of La fille mal gardée for the Royal Ballet of London. This production premiered on 28 January 1960, with the ballerina Nadia Nerina as Lise, David Blair as Colas, Stanley Holden as the Widow Simone, and Alexander Grant as Alen. Since its inception Ashton's staging has become a celebrated classic of the ballet repertory.

Originally Ashton intended to use the 1864 score of Peter Ludwig Hertel as it had been used for nearly every revival of the ballet since the late 19th century, but after close inspection of this music Ashton decided it would not suit his plans. At the suggestion of the ballet historian and musicologist Ivor Guest, Ashton found the light, simple music of the 1828 score by Ferdinand Hérold, more suitable for his conception.

Ashton then commissioned the Royal Opera House's conductor John Lanchbery to orchestrate and edit Hérold's score, using it as a foundation for an entirely new score, for which Lanchbery composed a few new numbers, incorporating passages of the original pastiche music from the premiere of 1789 into the score, and one number from Hertel's score which was utilised for the famous Clog Dance. Ashton was disappointed that Hérold's score contained no suitable Grand pas; Ivor Guest found a violin reduction of the pas de deux that Fanny Elssler had arranged for her performance in the ballet in 1837, tucked away in an old box of music at the Paris Opéra. This number is now known as The Fanny Elssler pas de deux.

Ashton created what is considered to be among his most masterful choreography for his new version of La fille mal gardée. He resurrected the pas de ruban for Lise and Colas, in which the lovers perform a charming pas with intricate tricks using a pink satin ribbon. Ashton took this idea to an entirely new level with the Fanny Elssler pas de deux, devising a spectacular Grand adage for Lise, Colas and eight women with eight ribbons. Ashton also included Petipa's original mimed sequence known as When I'm Married, a passage that was performed by all of the great ballerinas of old when they danced the role of Lise. He was taught this passage by Tamara Karsavina, former Ballerina of the Saint Petersburg Imperial Theatres and the Original Ballet Russe. She had in turn learned it from her teacher Pavel Gerdt, once the Imperial Ballet's leading male dancer who had partnered ballerinas of the late 19th century and early 20th century in the role of Lise.

Will Tuckett as the Widow Simone with members of the corps de ballet in the Clog Dance from the Royal Ballet's production of Ashton's La fille mal gardée, London, 2006

To inspire Lanchbery to write music for the Clog Dance, Ashton took the composer to a performance of Lancashire clog dancers. This dance is performed in the ballet by Lise's mother, the Widow Simone. Lanchbery decided to use the leitmotif for the Widow Simone from Hertel's score. Ashton fashioned a humorous number from this music for Simone and four ballerinas, at the beginning of which Lise tempts her mother with a pair of clogs; she puts them on and whirls into one of Ashton's most celebrated numbers, which also features the dancers using the clogs to perform sur la pointe (on their toes).

Ashton's 1960 version of La fille mal gardée has been staged for many companies throughout the world and has become the more or less "traditional" version, replacing the productions derived from the Petipa/Ivanov/Gorsky versions danced in Russia to the music of Hertel. Among such companies are the Bolshoi Ballet (2002), and American Ballet Theatre (2004). In spite of this, the famous La fille mal gardée pas de deux, which is taken from the Petipa/Ivanov/Gorsky versions of the ballet, is still performed with regularity as a gala excerpt, and is often used by various young dancers on the ballet competition circuit.

After Ashton's death, the rights to his staging of La fille mal gardée passed to Alexander Grant, the original performer of the role of Alain. In 2007, the Paris Opéra Ballet invited Grant to supervise a staging of Ashton's version, which premiered at the Palais Garnier on 22 July 2007 with Dorothée Gilbert as Lise, Nicolas Le Riche as Colas, Simon Valastro as Alain, and Stéphane Phavorin as Widow Simone.

As part of a contract between the BBC and the Royal Ballet signed in 1961, La fille mal gardée was one of nine ballets filmed for television, and was broadcast over Christmas 1962 with the original cast. There have been subsequent video recordings issued by the Royal Ballet. In 1962, Lanchbery recorded excerpts of music from his adaptation of Hérold's score, and in 1983 he recorded the complete work, again for Decca Records.

== The Ballet du Rhin's revival of the 1789 original ==
The performance history of La fille mal gardée came full circle in 1989, when the Ballet du Rhin of Mulhouse, France presented a revival of Dauberval's original production of 1789. The production was staged by Ivo Cramér, an expert in late 18th century and early 19th century dance theatre, and the Ballet du Rhin's artistic director, Jean-Paul Gravier. They painstakingly researched the original production, locating a copy of the original score in Stockholm, which describes the 1789 production, including details of the original mime passages. The original score was restored and orchestrated by the conductor Charles Farncombe. The designer Dominique Delouche created sets and costumes inspired by the designs used in the original. Though Dauberval's original choreography is lost, Cramer crafted dances in the style of the period, with heavy influence from folk dancing, as in the original. Cramer also restored the original scheme for the ballet's finale, in which the dancers, singing along with the music, shout out the refrain Il n'est qu'un pas du mal au bien ("There is only one step from bad to good"). The production was presented under the original title, Le ballet de la paille (The Ballet of Straw).

== Characters ==
- Lise, (the badly-guarded daughter)
- Colas, (Lise's beloved)
- Widow Simone, (Lise's mother, traditionally danced by a man)
- Alain, (Lise's rich dimwitted suitor)
- Thomas, (Alain's father)
- Notary
- Farm workers, friends of Lise and Colas
- Rooster and three hens

== Synopsis ==
The Fugitive by John Opie, 1800

Lise and Colas are in love and want to marry. However, the Widow Simone wants Lise to marry the dimwitted, but extremely rich, Alain, and has arranged (with Alain's father Thomas) for a marriage contract between Lise and Alain. The Widow Simone does her best to keep Lise and Colas apart, but is unsuccessful in her attempts to do so.

At harvest time the Widow Simone and Lise are taken to the field for a picnic lunch by Thomas and Alain. The farm workers join in a ribbon dance around a maypole, and the girls also join in a clog dance with the Widow Simone. There is a thunderstorm and everyone rushes for shelter. Alain is carried away on the wind by his open umbrella.

The Widow Simone and Lise return to their home. The widow wants Lise to sit down at the spinning wheel and spin, but Lise spins while she is up dancing, nearly strangling the widow. After a while, the widow wants Lise to dance, and Lise shows signs of unhappiness, but obliges. The widow takes a tambourine to play in time with Lise's dancing. When the widow is asleep, Lise tries to steal the key from the widow's pocket, to prevent the widow from locking her in, but is unsuccessful. The crops are brought in by the farm workers, and the widow then leaves the house (after locking the door behind her to prevent Lise from leaving the house). Lise thinks about Colas and mimes being the mother of a large number of children. To her embarrassment, Colas suddenly rises from the stacked crops. At the sound of the Widow Simone's returning to the house, Lise and Colas look around desperately for a place where he can hide. Not finding anywhere suitable in the living room, Lise takes Colas to her room, and she returns to the living room just before Widow Simone enters the house. The Widow Simone orders Lise to go to her room and put on her wedding dress for her forthcoming marriage to Alain. The horrified Lise tries to remain where she is, but the Widow Simone pushes Lise into her room and locks the door.

Thomas arrives with his son Alain (who is still clutching his umbrella). They are accompanied by a notary who is to act as witness to the marriage. The farm workers (friends of both Lise and Colas) also arrive. The Widow Simone gives Alain the key to Lise's room. When Alain unlocks the door to Lise's room, Lise appears in her wedding dress, accompanied by Colas. Thomas and Alain take offence, and the enraged Thomas tears up the marriage contract. Thomas, Alain and the notary leave the house in dudgeon. Lise and Colas then beg the Widow Simone to look favourably upon their suit. Love conquers all and the widow relents. Joyfully celebrating the happy outcome for Lise and Colas, everyone leaves, and the house is left quiet and empty, until Alain returns for his umbrella which he had accidentally left behind. So Alain is also happy with the love of his life – his umbrella.

== Recordings of the music ==
Recordings have been released of John Lanchbery's 1960 adaptation of the Ferdinand Hérold score and of excerpts from Hertel's 1864 score.

- La fille mal gardée – excerpts, John Lanchbery conducting the Orchestra of the Royal Opera House, Covent Garden. These excerpts from Lanchbery's 1960 adaptation of Hérold's 1828 score, recorded in February and March 1962, have regularly been reissued and frequently been praised by reviewers for the exceptional sound quality. The original LP (Decca SXL 2313) even found its way onto the "Superdisc List" maintained by The Absolute Sound.
- Hérold: La fille mal gardée (highlights), Barry Wordsworth conducting the Royal Liverpool Philharmonic Orchestra. This recording of excerpts from Lanchbery's 1960 adaptation of La fille mal gardée was originally released on LP in 1983 (HMV ASD1077701) and re-released in 1988 on CD (Classics for Pleasure 586 1782).
- Hérold – La fille mal gardée – complete, John Lanchbery conducting the Orchestra of the Royal Opera House, Covent Garden. This recording was originally released on LP in 1985 and has been reissued on CD (Decca 430,849–2 and Decca Eloquence 442 9048). It contains the complete score of La fille mal gardée in Lanchbery's adaptation.
- Hérold – La fille mal gardée (complete), DVD, choreography by Frederick Ashton, John Lanchbery conducting the Orchestra of the Royal Opera House, Covent Garden, with Lesley Collier, Michael Coleman, Recorded in performance 7 January 1981, Royal Opera House, Covent Garden, Kultur DVD.
- Hérold – La fille mal gardée (complete), DVD, choreography by Frederick Ashton, John Lanchbery conducting the Orchestra of the Royal Opera House, Covent Garden, with Nadia Nerina, David Blair, 1962 BBC recording, International Classical Artist DVD.
- Hérold – Hertel – La fille mal gardée (complete), DVD, choreography by Heinz Spoerli, John Lanchbery conducting Vienna Philharmonic, with Valentina Kozlova, Chris Jensen, and Basel Ballet, filmed in Cologne, 25 August – 10 September 1986, Deutsche Grammophon DVD.

=== Usage ===
The music from the Clog Dance is used for the soundtrack in the Christmas 2015 advertisement for Quality Street, a popular brand of confectionery in Britain.

== Historic photographs ==
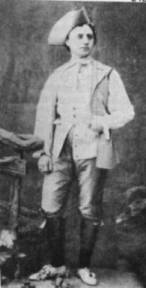
Pavel Gerdt as Colas in Jules Perrot's production, Saint Petersburg, circa 1865

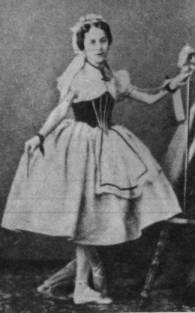
Anna Prikhounova as Lise in Jules Perrot's production, Saint Petersburg, circa 1865

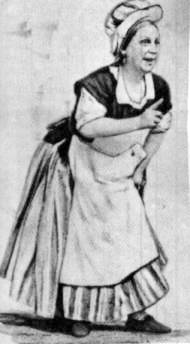
Vasily Geltser as the Widow Simone in Jules Perrot's production, Saint Petersburg, circa 1865

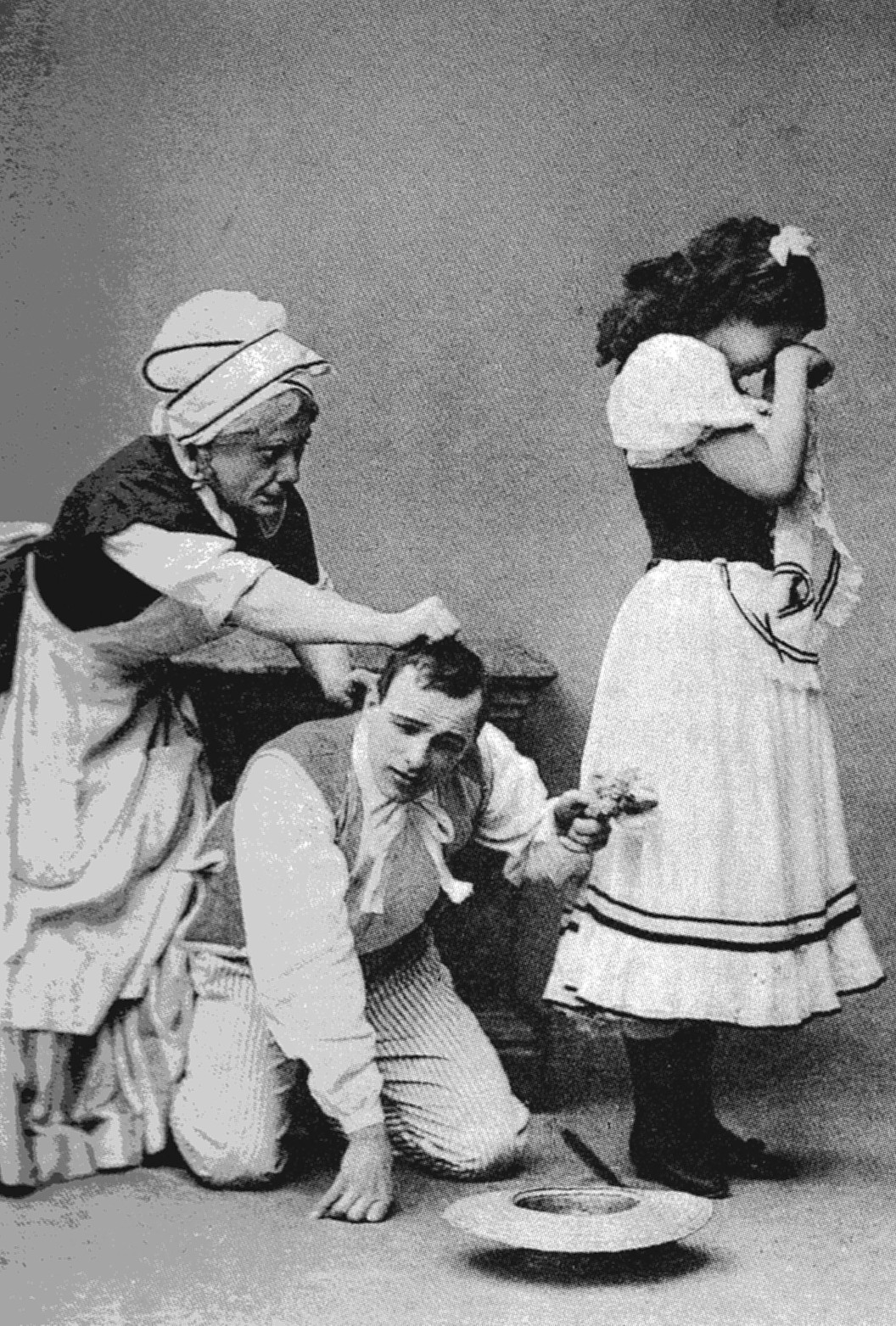
Vladimir Riabtzev as the Widow Simone, Mikhail Mordkin as Colas, and Sofia Fedorova as Lise in Alexander Gorsky's production, Moscow, circa 1915

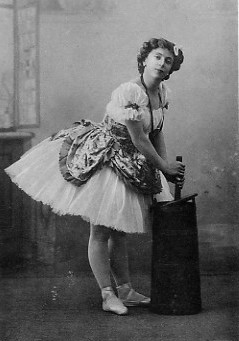
Olga Preobrajenskaya as Lise in the Petipa/Ivanov production. Saint Petersburg, 1899
