= Eugène Hus =

Franco-Belgian ballet dancer and choreographer

Pierre-Louis Stapleton (17 July 1758 in Brussels – 24 February 1823 in Brussels) was a ballet dancer and choreographer, born in the Austrian Netherlands who worked in France and the Netherlands. He was also known from around 1759 by the pseudonym Eugène Hus, after his stepfather Jean-Baptiste Hus.

== Life ==
He was the son of Louis Stapleton, an Irish officer in the garrison at Brussels, and Elisabeth Bayard, a ballet dancer at the Théâtre de la Monnaie known by the pseudonym Mlle Bibi. Deserted by his father when he went off on campaign, Pierre-Louis soon got on the stage alongside his mother. Aged around 4, he danced before prince Charles-Alexandre de Lorraine, who offered him 50 ducats in a gold box in recognition of his precocious talents, according to Hus's obituary in the Journal de Brussels. In 1762, Jean-Baptiste Hus arrived in Brussels as ballet master returning to the Théâtre de la Monnaie. Pierre-Louis was adopted by Hus (Elisabeth was Hus's mistress and later wife) and followed the couple on their wanderings, performing at Lyon (1764–67 and 1770–79), where Pierre-Louis began his career as a ballet master under Hus's guidance.

In Paris, he was engaged as a dancer and ballet master at the Théâtre-Italien from 1779 to 1780, then he returned to Lyon where he married an actress, Mlle. Soulier. On 9 February 1784, he premiered Le Ballon, a ballet de circonstance devoted to the work of the Montgolfier brothers, but the audience booed the piece so much that it was withdrawn after the first performance. Called to Bordeaux by Jean Dauberval in 1785, after the collapse of the Lyon management, Pierre-Louis restaged La Mort d'Orphée and Les Quatre fils Aymons there, ballets created by Jean-Baptiste in 1759 and 1780 respectively. He then took the pseudonym Eugène Hus. He danced at the Paris Opera in 1786, then in London in 1787.

Upon his return to Bordeaux, Eugène Hus took part, on 1 July 1789, in the premiere of Dauberval's Ballet de la paille, which would later become famous under the name La Fille mal gardée. After a stay in Rouen, Hus became second ballet master of the Paris Opera in 1793, where he created the Ballet des Muses. At the end of the century, the Théâtre de la Gaîté, the Jeunes-Artistes theatre, and the Opéra-Comique engaged him as ballet master, and new works followed. At the opening of the Théâtre de la Porte Saint-Martin, on 30 September 1802, Eugène Hus joined the new ballet troupe formed by Jean-Pierre Aumer to succeed him.

When the imperial decree of 1807 ordered the closure of several Parisian theatres, Hus traveled through the provinces and danced in Bordeaux, Marseille, Carcassonne, Lyon and Toulouse. It was then that the administration of the Théâtre de la Monnaie offered him the position of régisseur; Hus accepted and took up his duties on 1 December 1814. Three years later, he founded in Brussels the first Conservatory of Dance, which Jean-Antoine Petipa would reorganize in 1826. In addition to directing the ballet and the Conservatory, he was “in charge of Court festivities” for William I of the Netherlands. In 1819, he brought Jean-Antoine Petipa and his family from Marseille and gradually withdrew from the stage.

With Pierre Gardel and Auguste Vestris, Eugène Hus was one of the main founders of 19th century ballet and a witness to major political and artistic changes. He was the only living link between Noverre and Russian ballet, via the Petipa family.

== Works ==
- 1784 : Le Ballon (Lyon, 9 February)
- 1789 : L'Oracle accompli (Bordeaux, 24 August)
- 1790 : Lausus et Lydie (Nantes)
- 1793 : Les Muses, ou le Triomphe d'Apollon (Paris, 12 December)
- 1796 : Lise et Colin ou La Surveillance inutile, (Paris, 4 August)
- 1797 : Psyché (Rouen, July)
- 1798 : Tout cède à l'amour (Bordeaux, August)
- 1799 : Kiki, ou l'Île imaginaire (Paris, 9 November)
- 1800 : Augustine et Benjamin, ou le Sargines de village (Paris, 4 November)
- 1801 : Les Chevaliers du soleil, ou Amour et dangers (Paris, 21 June)
- 1801 : L'Héroïne de Boston, ou les Français au Canada (Paris, 12 October)
- 1802 : Riquet à la houpe (Paris, 13 December)
- 1803 : La Fille mal gardée, ou Il n'est qu'un pas du mal au bien, after Dauberval (Paris, 13 February)
- 1803 : Jeanne d'Arc, ou la Pucelle d'Orléans (Paris, 15 April)
- 1804 : Les Hamadryades, ou l'Amour vengé (Bordeaux, 22 March)
- 1804 : Les Vendangeurs du Médoc, ou les Deux baillis dupés (Paris, 20 July)
- 1804 : Le Gascon gascon malgré lui (Paris, 17 November)
- 1805 : L'Ingénu, ou le Sauvage du Canada (Paris, 17 January)
- 1805 : Amanda (Paris, 31 July)
- 1805 : L'Enchanteur Azolin, ou le Visir imaginaire (Paris, 12 December)
- 1806 : La Dansomanie ou la Fête de M. Petit-Pas (Bordeaux, August)
- 1807 : Les Illustres fugitifs, ou les Trois journées (Paris, 8 January)
- 1810 : Le Retour du seigneur, ou la Dot (Carcassonne, 23 February)
- 1813 : La Pucelle d'Orléans (Paris, 10 November)
- 1815 : Je l'aurais gagé ! (Brussels, 30 March)
- 1817 : La Naissance du fils de Mars et de Flore, ou les Vœux accomplis (Brussels, 27 March)
- 1818 : La Fête des dames, ou la Journée du 19 janvier (Brussels, 19 January)
- 1818 : Le Nid d'amours, ou les Amours vengés (Brussels, 9 March)

Preceded by Unknown	Director of Ballet at the Théâtre de la Monnaie; 1815–1819	Succeeded by Jean-Antoine Petipa
Preceded by Lecatte-Folleville	Director of the Théâtre de la Monnaie; 1815–1816	Succeeded by Joseph-Auguste Dubus
