= Lecatte-Folleville =

Gilles-Jean-Benoît Lecatte, known as Folleville (Paris, 14 May 1765 - Brussels, 9 August 1840), was a French actor mainly active in Brussels.

The son of an official in Louis XVI's court, he joined the French Navy and left for America. On his return to France he set up home in Nantes, where he made his debut, then in Rouen, Bordeaux and Amsterdam.

He was an actor at Liège in 1789, then at the Théâtre de Monsieur in 1790-1791, he arrived in Brussels in 1803. At the Théâtre de la Monnaie he played the rôles of kings, older noblemen and financiers until 1838, also heading the theatre from 1811 to 1815.

Preceded by Joseph-Auguste Dubus	director of the Théâtre de la Monnaie; 1811-1815	Succeeded by Eugène Hus
