= Jean-Baptiste Hus =

French ballet dancer and ballet master

Jean-Baptiste Hus (Paris, June 1736 – Paris, 1805) was a French ballet dancer and ballet master who used the pseudonym Hus-Malo. He was the son of François Hus and Françoise-Nicole Gravillon, the brother of the future actress Mlle Hus, and a member of the large Hus family, an 18th-century dynasty of dancers and actors. He was a student of Louis Dupré, Gaetan Vestris and Jean-Georges Noverre. He married the ballet dancer Elisabeth Bayard, also known as Mademoiselle Bibi, and adopted her son Pierre-Louis Stapleton as his own, who he helped build a career as a dancer.

Jean-Baptise Hus worked as a ballet master at La Monnaie starting from 1759.

== Biography ==
A student of Dupré, Vestris, and Jean-Georges Noverre, Jean-Baptiste Hus signed a contract with the Comédie-Française, from July 2, 1759, to Easter 1760, as ballet master. However, on June 6, 1759, he performed La Mort d'Orphée ou les Fêtes de Bacchus, a ballet praised by Fréron in L'Année littéraire and by La Harpe in Le Mercure de France. His older brother Auguste composed the music.

Jean-Baptiste Hus spent the next two seasons in Lyon, where he followed shortly after Noverre's departure for Stuttgart. Called to Brussels by the director of the La Monnaie Gourville, Hus arrived there at the beginning of the 1762-1763 season. He shared the role of ballet master with Felicini and La Rivière. On May 9, 1762, Jean-Baptiste Hus returned to Brussels with La Mort d'Orphée, which was reviewed at length in the Gazette des Pays-Bas. On June 15, he performed Mars et Vénus surpris par Vulcain, a ballet he had created in Lyon in August 1761.

A dancer he had met in Paris, Élisabeth Bayard, known as Mlle Bibi, bore him several children in Brussels and Lyon. The couple married on September 20, 1775, in the parish of Feillens (now in the department of Ain). During this ceremony, Jean Baptiste Hus called himself Hus Malo. The couple acknowledged four children on this occasion. The eldest, Pierre Louis, was declared to have been baptized in Brussels under the name Stapleton, “a name borrowed to preserve their reputation and to avoid being known by their real names in foreign countries.” Pierre-Louis Stapleton, who became Pierre Louis Hus Malo through this declaration, would later be known as Eugène Hus. Three other children were recognized by the couple: Jean Pierre, Magdelaine, and Pierre François, all three born in Lyon, in the parish of Saints Pierre et Saturnin.

The couple then returned to Lyon, where they probably remained until 1779, when Hus joined the Comédie-Italienne as ballet master. Shortly before the theater closed and the Italian genre was abolished in 1780, Hus returned to Lyon and took over the management of the theater, which he shared with Félix Gaillard. They then managed the new Grand Théâtre de Bordeaux and returned to Lyon from 1784 to 1786.

After a short stay in London with his son, Hus took charge of the theaters in Brittany until 1791, before returning to Bordeaux. He probably ceased all activity shortly thereafter and died in Metz in 1812.

== Children ==
- Pierre-Louis Stapleton, born on 17 June 1758 and adopted by Jean-Baptiste Hus.
- Albert-Francois-Joseph, born and baptised in Brussels on 29 May 1762.
- Jean-Pierre, born and baptised on 19 October 1766.
- Madeleine, baptised at Lyon on 16 April 1770.
- Pierre-François, baptised on 19 November 1774.
