= Johann Georg Wunderlich =

German composer and musician

Johann Georg Wunderlich (also Jean-Georges Vounderlich, Wonderlich, Wounderlich) (2 February 1755 – 1819) was a German composer and flautist.

He was first taught by his father, who was an oboist in the chapel of the principality of Ansbach. At age 21, Wunderlich took flute lessons in Paris with Felix Rault. From 1778 to 1783 he was a member of the Concert Spirituel orchestra. He "performed a solo concerto there on 7 June 1778 and appeared regularly as a soloist in 1779." In 1781 Wunderlich joined the Paris Opera as second flautist and quickly rose to principal, which he remained until 1813 when he was succeeded by Jean-Louis Tulou.

From 1795 to 1803 Wunderlich taught at the Conservatory of Paris. He taught many students, including Jean-Louis Tulou, Benoit Tranquille Berbiguier, and Joseph Guillou. He continued teaching until 1816.

In 1804 Wunderlich published a textbook on flute method and technique. It was a completion of a work by his colleague, Antoine Hugot who had since died.
