= Françoise Hus =

French actress and playwright

Françoise-Nicole Hus, maiden name Gravillon, was an 18th-century French actress and playwright born 2 October 1710 in Lyon.

In 1730, she married the troupe leader François Hus, the eldest of a family of comedians and dancers. She was the mother of at least five children, including Jean-Baptiste, and Adélaïde-Louise-Pauline who would perform at the Comédie-Française under the name Mlle Hus.

In 1751, the family company dispersed and Françoise Hus traveled to Paris to accompany the debut of her daughter at the Comédie-Française.

In September 1756, she had her only play, Plutus, rival de l'Amour, presented which was given four times at the Comédie-Italienne in Paris.

In 1762, Mme. Hus appeared at the Comédie-Française, but she left after the second performance because of the audience reaction. She probably died around 1780.
