= Pontlevoy Abbey =

Benedictine abbey in France

Coordinates: 47.3890°N 1.2565°E

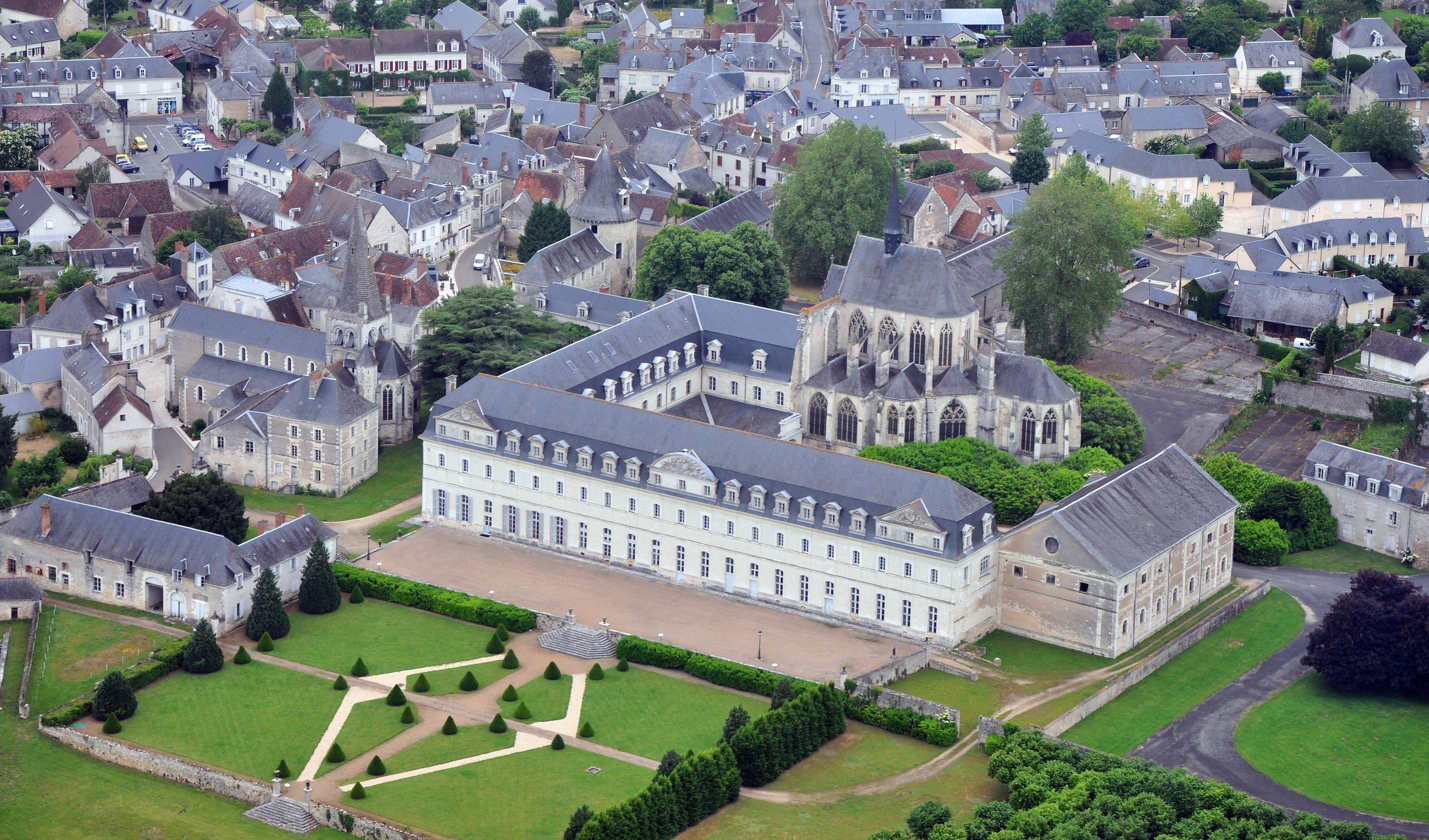
The monastery buildings from above

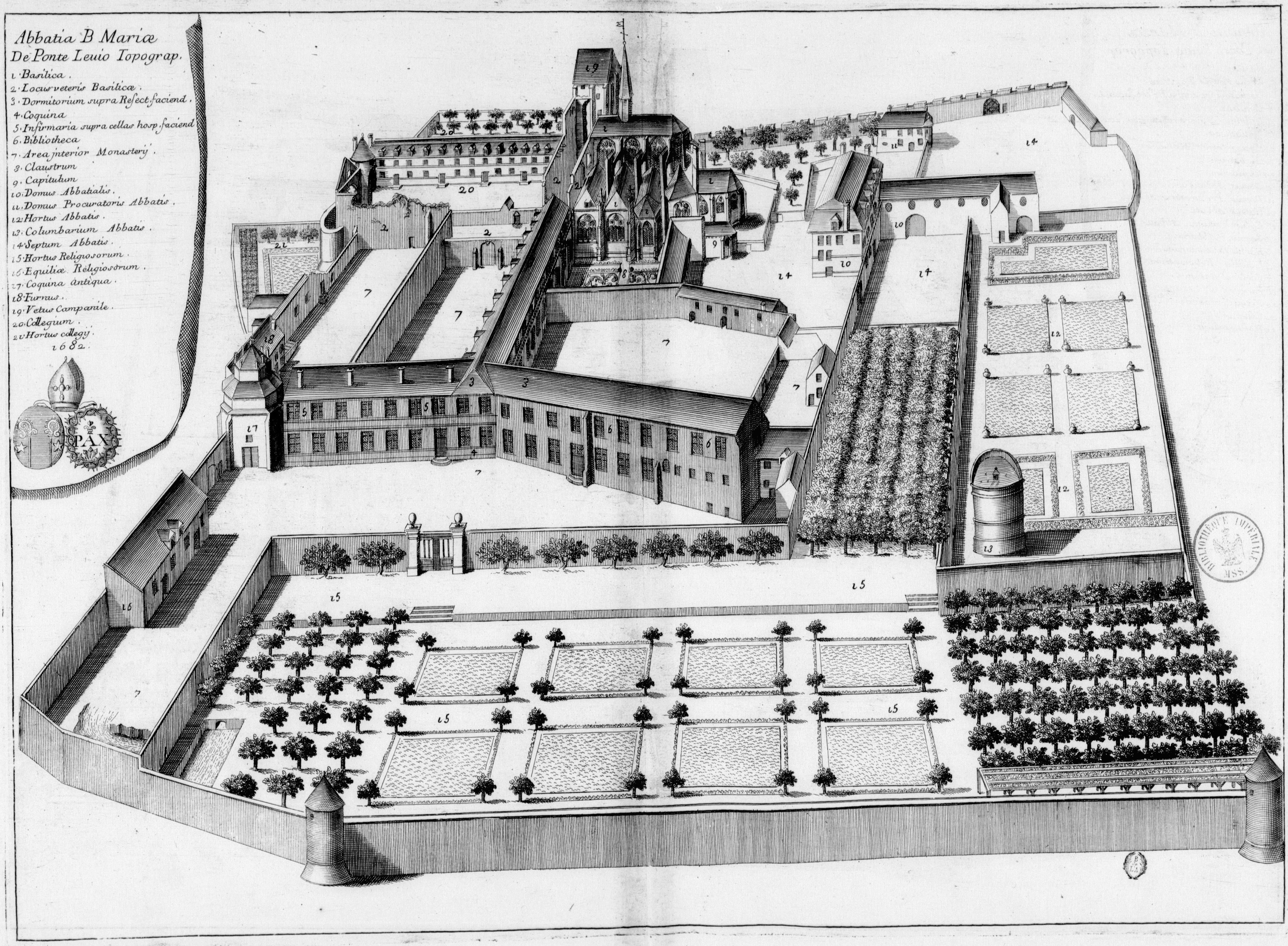
Engraving of the monastery in the 17th-century Monasticon Gallicanum

Pontlevoy Abbey is a former Benedictine abbey located in the town of Pontlevoy in the Loir-et-Cher department of France.

== History ==
It was founded in fulfillment of a vow in 1034 by Gueldouin or Gelduin de Chaumont, a local knight. It is believed that Gelduin's boat was caught in a storm on the way back from a Crusade in the Holy Land. He prayed to the Virgin for help, promising to build Her a church in Pontlevoy, which he held as a vassal of the Count of Blois. Allegedly, the Virgin dressed in white, appeared above the rolling deck and calmed the sea.

Gelduin endowed the abbey with enough revenue for Benedictine monks to build a huge church, dedicated to the White Virgin. From the east, it looks like a complete Gothic cathedral with flying buttresses and trefoil stone tracery in the windows of the radiating chapels. There is a gravel courtyard where the nave should be. The monks treated the sick and educated children.

The church was almost completely destroyed during the Hundred Years' War. The monks rebuilt the apse and choir but couldn't afford to replace the rest. Inside, on the wall behind the altar, there is a little 11th-century statue of the White Virgin with her Child in her arms. The child leans against her left shoulder. She presses his left hand to her heart. The naif style indicates it was done by a local mason rather than a professional sculptor. The monks ran a hospital here, with a sanctuary for lepers, until the 16th century and also educated local children. But by 1623, when Cardinal Richelieu was named abbot, the monks had abandoned their vows and the buildings were in ruins.

Richelieu repaired them in 1644 and brought in six Benedictine monks from the Congregation of Saint Maur. They started a seminary for the sons of the nobility and the rich bourgeoisie. Students came even from England. In 1776, Louis XVI turned the school into one of the 12 royal military academies of France; a huge cedar of Lebanon in the courtyard was planted in honour of his accession to the throne. The military school was suppressed on the French Revolution but the college in the monastery was left open as a private secular institution, headed by a secularized Benedictine. It was a boarding school with a conservative tradition; some families moved to Pontlevoy to be near their sons. The mid- nineteenth century director, Abbé Louis Alexis Bourgeois, conducted subsequently controverted research into prehistoric remains of the area. They built large, elegant houses with steep, slate roofs, walled gardens and spiked wrought-iron fences that still grace the town. The huge 18th-century building - three stories high with a mansard roof - resembles those government ministry buildings around the Palais Bourbon in Paris. The college housed German troops during World War Two and closed for a period of time after the War.

The previous owner of the abbey and the college was the Marquis de Vibraye, a descendant of Gelduin, allowed Pontlevoy to open a municipal museum on the third floor. The first two rooms displayed a collection of 19th- and early 20th- century cards advertising Poulain Chocolates. The company, founded by Auguste Poulain, who was born in Pontlevoy in 1815, is still a major manufacturer in Blois. Poulain was a pioneer of modern advertising. Each year his company issued a new series of brightly colored cards commemorating notable men (including Benjamin Franklin) with flowers and illustrations of fairy tales. They were collected and traded throughout Touraine in the 19th century.

In the 1980s there was a Museum of Heavy Trucks at the Abbey which was a project of the former mayor, Mr. Maffre. It included about 40 vehicles. Mr. Maffre's pride: a 1935 electric delivery van from the Poulain factory; a De Dion Bouton, from 1918, the oldest truck in the collection, and an American G.M.C. used by the Swiss army in 1942.

The building was classed as a historic monument on 6 April 1934 and 19 April 1991. It was bought in 2001 to house "The European American Center for International Education", whose aim is to promote and develop cultural exchange between Europe and the United States. This was closed in 2017. Since the end of 2018, it is used by the lycée catholique de Pontlevoy, a secondary school.
