= Peter Ludwig Hertel =

German composer (1817–1899)

Peter Ludwig Hertel (21 April 1817 – 13 June 1899) was a German composer of dance music and ballet music. He is best known as the composer of the ballet La fille mal gardée. He also composed the music for the Faust ballet Satanella oder Metamorphosen, and "Die Abenteuer von Flick und Flock" (The Adventure of Flick and Flock), both choreographed by Paul Taglioni.

Hertel was born in Berlin. He studied violin and composition under the renowned musicians of his era, Eduard Rietz, Friedrich Schneider, Adolf Marx. From 1858 until his death he worked as a chapelmaster and composer at the Royal Opera House. In 1860 he worked as a visiting conductor at London’s Covent Garden.

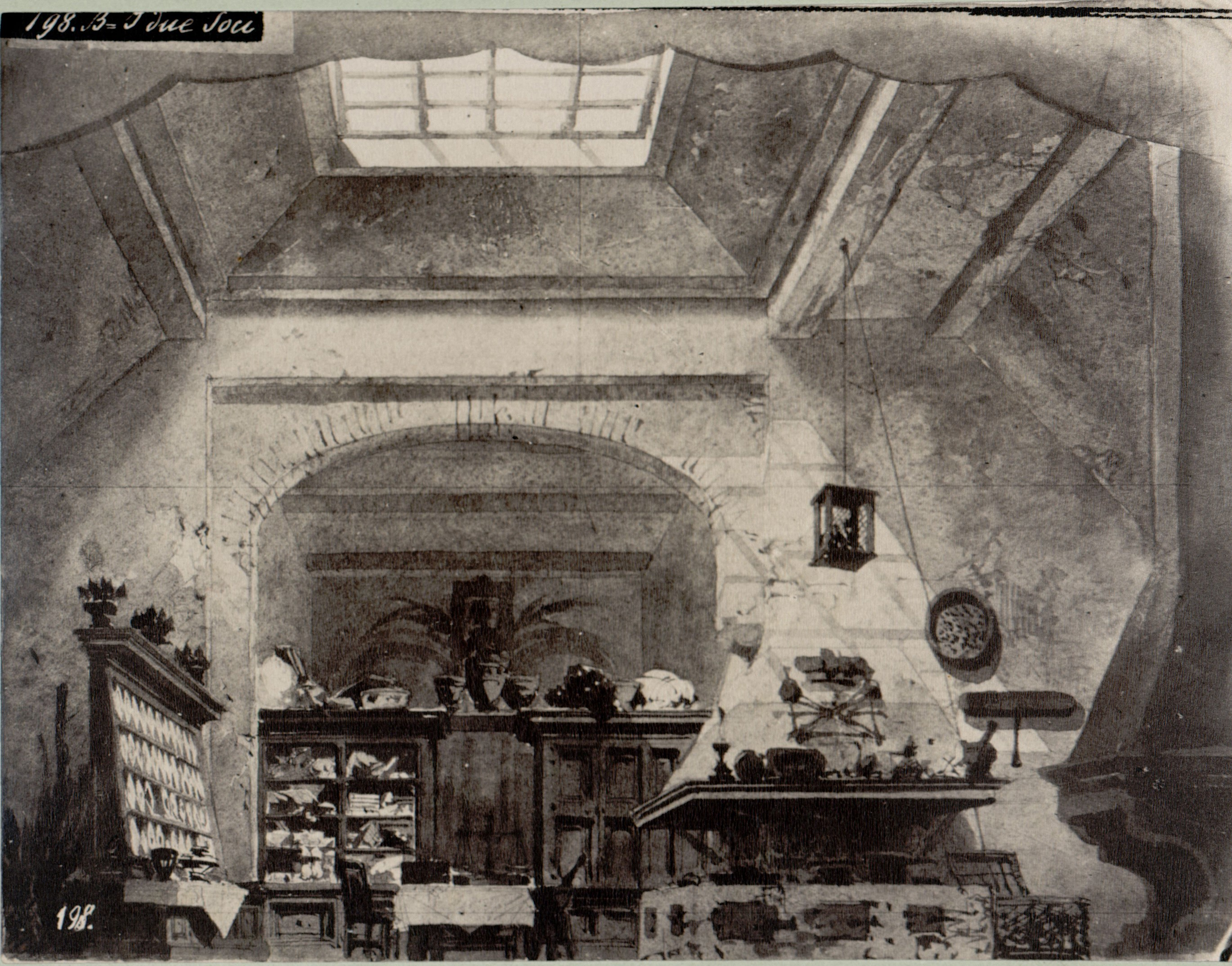
Una cucina, set design for I due soci act 2 scene 5 (1863).
