= Jacqueline Challet-Haas =

French dancer (1934–2022)

- Born: Jacqueline Étiennette Haas; 26 December 1934; Duvy, France
- Died: 6 July 2022 (aged 87)
- Education: École supérieure d'études chorégraphiques
- Occupations: Dancer, professor

Jacqueline Challet-Haas (26 December 1934 – 6 July 2022) was a French dancer and professor.

== Biography ==
Challet-Haas studied ballet under Atty Chadinoff, Olga Preobrajenska, Alexandra Balashova, and Lyubov Yegorova. She also studied modern dance under Kurt Jooss and Laura Sheleen, as well as Labanotation under Diana Baddeley-Lange and Albrecht Knust. She graduated from the École supérieure d'études chorégraphiques in Paris in 1957.

Challet-Haas became a professor of dance notation at Paris-Sorbonne University from 1984 to 1988 and subsequently taught at Paris 8 University Vincennes-Saint-Denis from 1989 to 1991. On the advice of Quentin Rouillier, she created a class on Labanotation at the Conservatoire de Paris in 1990.

In 1975, Challet-Haas became director of the Centre national d'écriture du mouvement, founded by Théodore d'Erlanger in 1962. She became a member of the International Council of Cinetography Laban upon its founding in 1959 and became honorary vice-president in 2013. In 2010, she began her collaboration with professor Robert Kaddouch in writing instrumental movements. Her work was recorded in the book Enseigner l'interprétation, réflexions et techniques, published in 2013.

Jacqueline Challet-Haas died on 6 July 2022 at the age of 87.

== Publications ==
- Manuel pratique de danse classique (1979)
- La Danse, les principes de son enseignement aux enfants (1983)
- Terminologie de la danse classique (1987)
- La Maîtrise du mouvement (1994)
- Grammaire de la notation Laban. Cinétographie Laban (1999)
- La Danse moderne éducative (2003)
- Dictionnaire usuel de cinétographie Laban (Labanotation) (2011)
- Enseigner l'interprétation musicale, réflexions et techniques (2017)
