= Pierre-Louis Hus-Desforges =

French cellist, conductor and composer

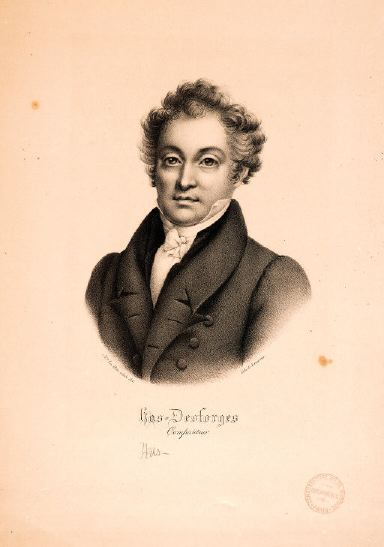
- Born: 24 March 1773; Toulon
- Died: 20 January 1838 (aged 64); Pontlevoy
- Occupations: Cellist; Conductor; Composer.

Pierre-Louis Hus-Desforges (24 March 1773 – 20 January 1838) was a French cellist, conductor and composer. He is sometimes incorrectly referred to as "Pierre-Louis Hus-Desforges Jarnowick".

The grandson of theatre manager Barthélemy Hus-Desforges, he came from a long line of entertainers, the Hus family, and his grandmother was a Courtenay.

After he finished his studies at the Conservatoire de Paris with Benoit Tranquille Berbiguier, he began as a cellist in various orchestras. In the early nineteenth century, he was conductor at St. Petersburg, returned to Paris, then taught in Metz from 1819 to 1822.

== Works ==
- Concerto pour violoncelle
- Messe à trois voix et à grand orchestre
- Several Quintetto pour deux violons, alto, violoncelle et basse
- Several Sonatines brillantes et faciles pour violoncelle
- Sinfonie concertante pour violon et violoncelle obligés (c. 1797)
- L'Autel de sa patrie, melody by Citoyen Desforges (1798)
- Méthode de violoncelle à l'usage des commençants (1828)
- 3 duos opus 31 for violin and cello
