= 10830 Desforges =

Main-belt asteroid

Discovery
- Discovered by: E. W. Elst
- Discovery site: La Silla Obs.
- Discovery date: 20 October 1993

Designations
- Named after: Jacques Desforges (French priest)
- Alternative designations: 1993 UT_{6} · 1982 FS_{2} 1984 SS_{7}
- Minor planet category: main-belt · (middle) background · Eunomia

Orbital characteristics
- Epoch 23 March 2018 (JD 2458200.5)
- Uncertainty parameter 0
- Observation arc: 35.27 yr (12,884 d)
- Aphelion: 3.1271 AU
- Perihelion: 2.1944 AU
- Semi-major axis: 2.6607 AU
- Eccentricity: 0.1753
- Orbital period (sidereal): 4.34 yr (1,585 d)
- Mean anomaly: 151.24°
- Mean motion: 0° 13^{m} 37.56^{s} / day
- Inclination: 11.153°
- Longitude of ascending node: 178.72°
- Argument of perihelion: 307.82°

Physical characteristics
- Mean diameter: 4.21 km (calculated); 7.692±2.245 km 9.390±0.203 km
- Synodic rotation period: 8.804±0.0058 h
- Geometric albedo: 0.0635±0.0545; 0.0797±0.0101; 0.080±0.010; 0.21 (assumed)
- Spectral type: S (assumed)
- Absolute magnitude (H): 13.5; 13.6; 13.739±0.008 (R); 14.18; 14.19

10830 Desforges, provisional designation 1993 UT_{6}, is a background or Eunomian asteroid from the central regions of the asteroid belt, approximately 7 kilometers (4 miles) in diameter. It was discovered on 20 October 1993, by Belgian astronomer Eric Elst at the La Silla Observatory in northern Chile. The likely elongated S-type asteroid has a rotation period of 8.8 hours. It was named after French priest and aviation visionary Jacques Desforges.

== Orbit and classification ==
Desforges is a non-family asteroid of the main belt's background population when applying the hierarchical clustering method to its proper orbital elements. Based on osculating Keplerian orbital elements, the asteroid has also been classified as a member of the Eunomia family (502), a prominent family of stony S-type asteroid and the largest one in the intermediate main belt with more than 5,000 members.

It orbits the Sun in the central main-belt at a distance of 2.2–3.1 AU once every 4 years and 4 months (1,585 days; semi-major axis of 2.66 AU). Its orbit has an eccentricity of 0.18 and an inclination of 11° with respect to the ecliptic. The body's observation arc begins with its first observations as 1982 FS_{2} at Klet Observatory in March 1982, more than 11 years prior to its official discovery observation at La Silla.

== Physical characteristics ==
Desforges is an assumed stony S-type asteroid, which is the overall spectral type for members of the Eunomia family. Observations with the Wide-field Infrared Survey Explorer (WISE), however, gave a low geometric albedo more typical for an X- or C-type asteroid (see below).

=== Rotation period ===
In August 2010, a rotational lightcurve of Desforges was obtained from photometric observations in the R-band by astronomers at the Palomar Transient Factory in California. Lightcurve analysis gave a rotation period of 8.804 hours with a high brightness amplitude of 0.69 magnitude, which indicates that the body has a non-spherical shape (U=2).

=== Diameter and albedo ===
According to the survey carried out by the NEOWISE mission of NASA's WISE telescope, Desforges measures between 7.692 and 9.390 kilometers in diameter and its surface has an albedo between 0.0635 and 0.080.

The Collaborative Asteroid Lightcurve Link assumes an albedo of 0.21 – derived from the Eunomia family's parent body, 15 Eunomia – and calculates a diameter of 4.21 kilometers based on an absolute magnitude of 14.19.

== Naming ==
This minor planet was named after a French priest Jacques Desforges (1723–1791), who was imprisoned for eight months in 1758 in the Bastille, during which time he planned the construction of a flying machine. The official naming citation was published by the Minor Planet Center on 18 March 2003 (M.P.C. 48156).
