= Hus family =

French family of performing artists

The Hus family was an 18th-century French dynasty of ballet dancers and actors.

== The Hus brothers ==
The Frères Hus were two family members who collaborated between 1720 and 1750 to direct an acting company touring France and the Austrian Netherlands. François Hus and Barthélemy Hus-Desforges led their company around towns in southern France (Marseille, Avignon, Montpellier, Perpignan, Toulouse and Bordeaux), the Rhône valley (Lyon, Chambéry and Grenoble), Brittany, Normandy (Rennes, Nantes, Le Havre and Rouen), northern France (Douai) and what is now Belgium Ghent and Brussels).

== Family tree ==
François Hus and Françoise Gravillon had the following children:

- Adélaïde-Louise-Pauline Hus (31 March 1734, Rennes - 18 October 1805, Paris), stage name Mademoiselle Hus, French actress
- Jean-Baptiste Hus, ballet dancer
