= Barthélemy Hus-Desforges =

French comedian and actor

Barthélemy Hus, called Hus-Desforges (18 July 1699 in Bordeaux – 1 September 1786 in Lyon, aged 63) was an 18th-century French comedian and troupe leader.

The son of maître à danser Jérôme Hus and Marguerite Pageot, called Desforges, he was the youngest member of the Hus family and with his brother François, directed a touring company known as the "Hus brothers troupe."

Around 1722, he married Marie Anne Daguerre Ascorette, actress born in Namur (1709-1736). The couple had at least seven children who would be part of the troupe.

On 27 January 1750, he married in Brussels his second wife, Louise Vivier de Courtenay, descendant of the famous Courtenay family.

Barthélemy Hus-Desforges was the grandfather of musician Pierre-Louis Hus-Desforges (1773-1838).
