= François Hus =

French comedian

François Hus was an 18th-century French comedian and head of troupe born 7 September 1695 in Marseille and died before 1774.

== Family ==
The son of maître à danser Jérôme Hus and Marguerite Pageot, called Desforges, he was the eldest member of the Hus family and with his brother Barthélemy, would lead a traveling troupe known as the "Hus brothers's troupe."

In 1730, he married Françoise-Nicole Gravillon, actress and playwright from Lyon. From this union were born in particular the dancer Jean-Baptiste and Adélaïde-Louise-Pauline, future Mlle Hus of the Comédie-Française.
