= Jean Dauberval =

French dancer and ballet master (1742–1806)

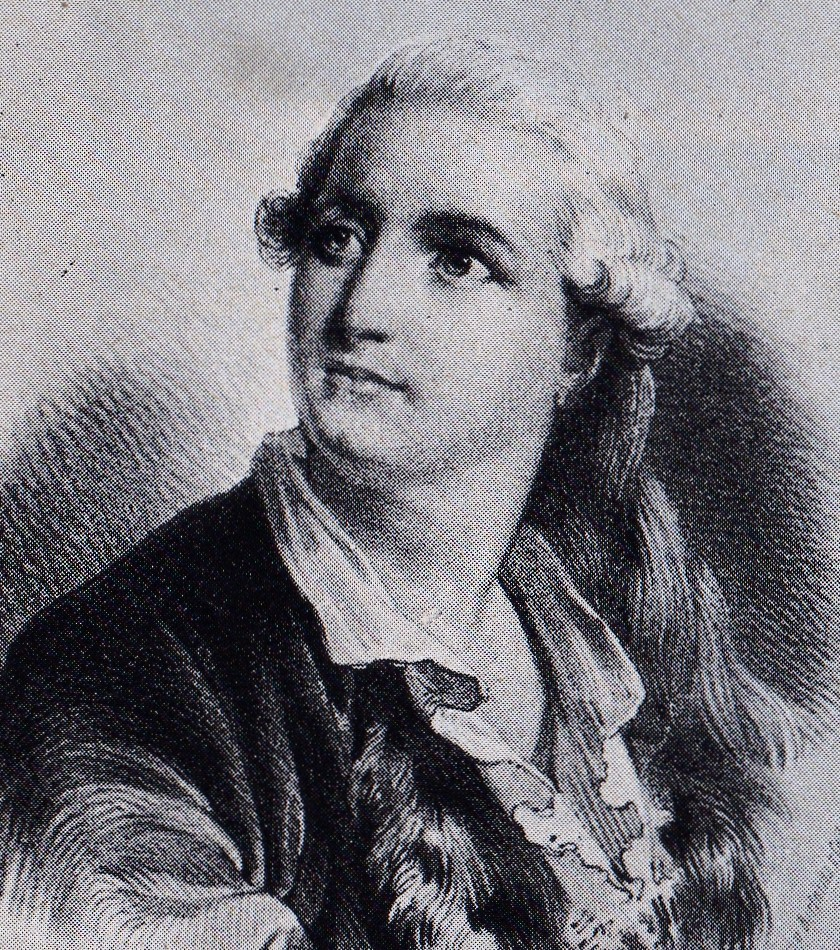
- Lithograph, c. 1790
- Born: Jean Bercher; 19 August 1742; Montpellier, France
- Died: 14 February 1806 (aged 63); Tours, France
- Occupation: Dancer
- Career
- Former groups: Paris Opera Ballet

Jean Dauberval or Jean D'Auberval (born Jean Bercher; 19 August 1742 –, 14 February 1806) was a French dancer and ballet master. He is most noted for creating the ballet, La fille mal gardée, one of the most enduring and popular works of the ballet repertoire.

== Training and Career ==
Dauberval was trained at the school of the Paris Opéra where he studied under the great Jean-Georges Noverre. He was appointed premier danseur of the ballet of the Académie Royale de Musique in 1763, and, in 1771, he was named ballet master. From 1781 until 1783, he was engaged as Maître de Ballet to the Académie, and in 1783–84 season in London's King's Theatre.

In 1783, Dauberval moved to Bordeaux, where he accepted the post of maître de ballet to the Grand Théâtre de Bordeaux, a position he held until 1791. In 1789, Dauberval created his most enduring ballet, La Fille mal gardée, in which his wife, the dancer Marie-Madeleine Crespé, who is known to history as Madame Théodore, created the role of Lison. (The role is known as "Lise" today.) Charles Didelot sometimes referred to as the ''father of the Russian ballet'', and Salvatore Vigano who in Italy, introduced dance-drama were Dauberval's pupils.

During his time, he was admired most for his ability to integrate dramatic action into dance.

== Noted works ==
- The Pastimes of Terpsicore (1783, King's Theatre, London)
- Friendship lead to Love (1783, King's Theater, London)
- The Slaves of Conquering Bacchus (1784, King's Theater, London)
- Le Réveil du bonheur (1784, King's Theater, London)
- Orpheo (1784, King's Theatre, London)
- The Four Ages of Man (1784, King's Theatre, London)
- Pygmalion (1784, King's Theatre, London)
- Le Déserteur, ou La Clémence Royale (1784, King's Theatre, London)
- Le Page inconstant (1787, based on La Folle Journée, ou Le Mariage de Figaro by Beaumarchais, Grand-Théâtre, Bordeaux)
- Psyché et l'Amour (1788, Grand-Théâtre, Bordeaux)
- La Fille mal gardée (1789, Grand-Théâtre, Bordeaux)
- Amphion et Thalie, ou L’Élève des Muses (1791, Pantheon Theatre, London)
- Telemachus in the Island of Calipso (1791, Pantheon Theatre, London)
- Le Triomphe de la Folie (1791, Pantheon Theatre, London)
- Le Siège de Cythère (1791, Pantheon Theatre, London)
- La Fontaine d’amour (1791, Pantheon Theatre, London)
- L’Amant déguisé (1791, Pantheon Theatre, London)
- La Fête villageoise (1791, Pantheon Theatre, London)
