= Pontlevoy =

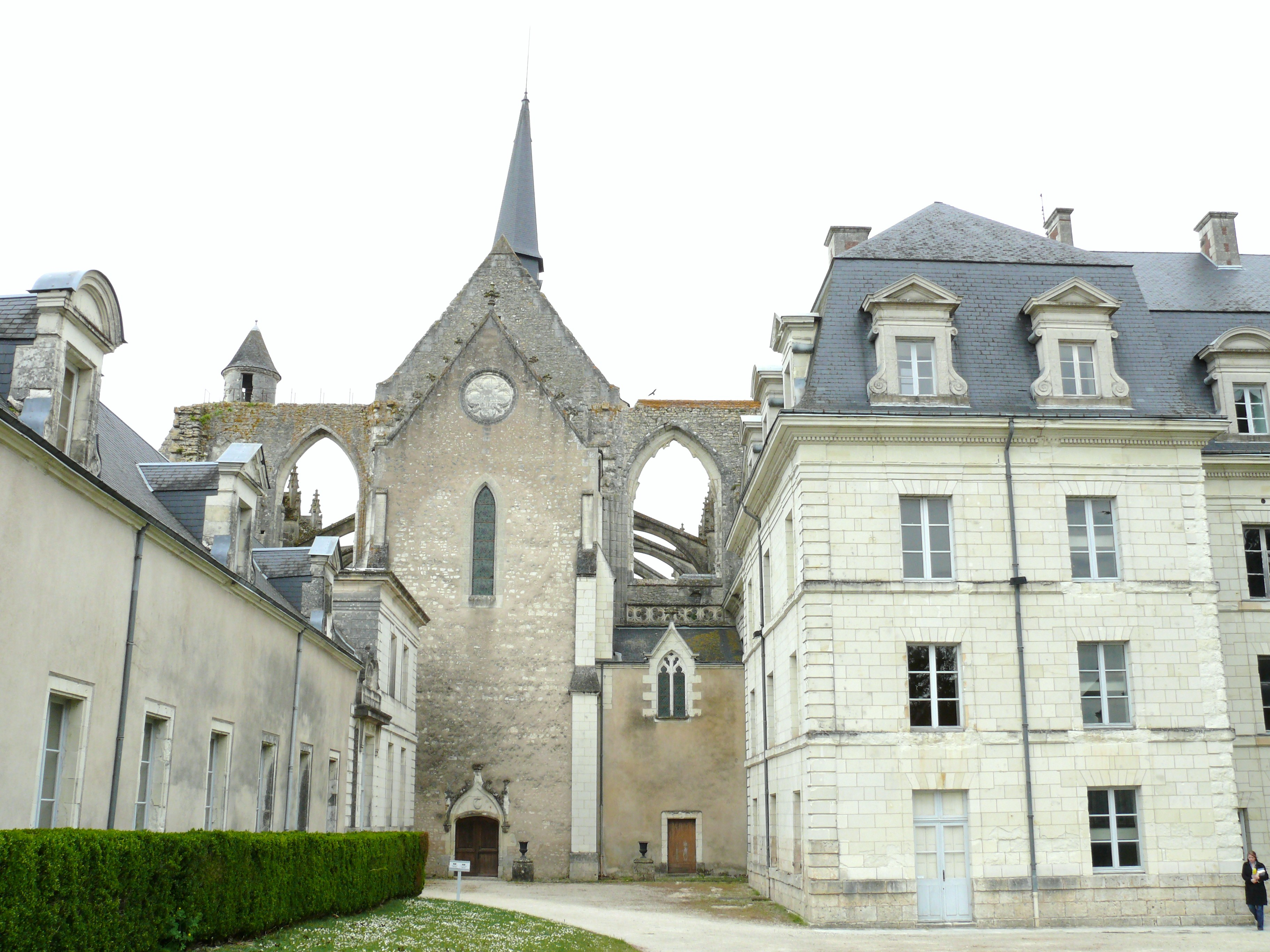
- Abbey

- Coat of arms
- Location of Pontlevoy
- Location within France Location within Centre-Val de Loire
- Coordinates: 47°23′23″N 1°15′16″E
- Country: France
- Region: Centre-Val de Loire
- Department: Loir-et-Cher
- Arrondissement: Romorantin-Lanthenay
- Canton: Montrichard Val de Cher

Government
  - Mayor (2020–2026): Jean-Louis Berthault
- Area^{1}: 51.12 km^{2} (19.74 sq mi)
- Elevation: 99 m (325 ft)
- Highest elevation: 137 m (449 ft)
- Lowest elevation: 77 m (253 ft)
- Population (2023): 1,556
  - Density: 30.44/km^{2} (78.83/sq mi)
- Time zone: UTC+01:00 (CET)
  - Summer (DST): UTC+02:00 (CEST)
- INSEE/Postal code: 41180 /41400
- ^{1} French Land Register data, which excludes lakes, ponds, glaciers > 1 km^{2} (0.386 sq mi or 247 acres) and river estuaries.

Pontlevoy (French pronunciation: [pɔ̃ləvwa]) is a commune in the Loir-et-Cher department, central France.

== Geography ==
The village of Pontlevoy is 14 miles southwest of Blois, in the eastern part of Touraine. It is a 20-minute drive from the chateaux of Amboise, Cheverny, Chaumont or Chenonceau, and about an hour's drive from Azay-le-Rideau, Loches or Chambord. The summer is their tourist season. The French spoken in Touraine is said to be the purest in the country. The medieval battle of Pontlevoy took place in its neighbourhood.

== History ==
Pontlevoy's main street, the Rue du Colonel Filloux, named after the colonel who is identified on the sign as a Humaniste et Technicien (1869-1957). Colonel Filloux perfected the 155-millimeter howitzer for the French army.

Most of the shops and houses were built between the 15th and 19th centuries. The architectural detail makes Pontlevoy charming: a crouching monkey carved in limestone on the cornice of a building on the Rue des Singes (Monkey Street), a sun over the doorway of the 17th-century Maison du Dauphin. According to legend, Louis XIV's grandson stayed there overnight.

The Rue de la Juiverie is the only remnant of the ancient Jewish community of Pontlevoy. Touraine was settled by Jews and Romans until their persecution and eventual expulsion from the region in 1306 caused by antisemitism.

Pontlevoy's abbey made the town an important commercial and cultural center, founded in 1034 by Gelduin de Chaumont and re-established in 1644 by cardinal Richelieu.

Between 1902 and 1963, Louis Clergeau, a local watchmaker, and his daughter took more than 10,000 photographs of life in Pontlevoy. The museum also highlighted their work. The Clergeau collection is as remarkable a picture of French life as the work of the photographer Jacques H. Lartigue.

Pontlevoy is about five miles from the river Cher, which up to November 1942 was the dividing line between occupied and unoccupied France. Pontlevoy was occupied, many refugees were hidden there.

== Population ==
Historical population
Year	Pop.	±% p.a.
1968	1,688	—
1975	1,413	−2.51%
1982	1,486	+0.72%
1990	1,423	−0.54%
1999	1,460	+0.29%
2007	1,552	+0.77%
2012	1,538	−0.18%
2017	1,524	−0.18%
2023	1,556	+0.35%
Source: INSEE

== Sights ==
Pontlevoy's memorial to all its dead from World War I and II is behind a green iron fence on the Route de Montrichard, On the four sides of the monument are the names of 81 men, listed year by year, who were killed in 1914-18 and 10 others, who died in 1939-45. In World War I Pontlevoy lost about 10 percent of its population.

On the corner of the Avenue Malingie and the Route de Montrichard, Pontlevoy has erected a small concrete cenotaph commemorating its martyrs and victims of Nazism from 1939 to 45.

== Personalities ==
The French composer Pierre-Louis Hus-Desforges died in the city 20 January 1838.

Antoine le Picard de Philippeaux was born in this village. He died in Saint Jean d'Acre ('Saint John of Acre', the city Acre, Israel) (1767-1799).

== Twin towns ==
Pontlevoy is twinned with:

- Gignod, Italy

== See also ==
- Communes of the Loir-et-Cher department
