= Adélaïde-Louise-Pauline Hus =

Adélaïde-Louise-Pauline Hus (1734–1805) was a French stage actress and courtesan. She was engaged at the Comédie-Française in Paris in 1751–1773.

== Life ==
She was born to François Hus. She was the student of Hippolyte Clairon.

She made her debut at the Comédie-Française in 1751, but was not engaged there until two years later. She became a Sociétaires of the Comédie-Française in 1753. She retired in 1780, and was granted a royal pension in 1786.

She performed with success the title roles of Andromaque, Monime and Chimène, as well as Agnès in L’École des femmes and Agathe in Folies amoureuses (Regnard). She performed many prestigious roles within tragedy despite the competition with Mademoiselle Clairon, Mademoiselle Dumesnil and Mademoiselle Gaussin. However, she had more talent for her roles of heroines of comedy, which were her most popular ones. She supported the controversial political play Les Philosophes by Palissot to be set.

She is known for her rivalry with Mademoiselle d'Épinay (Pierrette Hélène Pinet, also known as Mademoiselle Molé).

She is also known as a courtesan. Her stage career was protected by her beneficiary, the rich Auguste Louis Bertin. The story about her breakup with Bertin is famous: when she was discovered with a younger lover, Bertin ordered her to leave the house which he paid for and kept for her, with nothing but what she could carry with her inside her dress.

In 1775, she married the court official Louis-Elie Lelièvre. She retired from the stage with a fortune in 1780. She spent the rest of her life in comfortable retirement, and was noted for her philanthropy.
